

42001–42100 

|-bgcolor=#fefefe
| 42001 ||  || — || December 30, 2000 || Socorro || LINEAR || — || align=right | 2.5 km || 
|-id=002 bgcolor=#E9E9E9
| 42002 ||  || — || December 30, 2000 || Socorro || LINEAR || — || align=right | 2.8 km || 
|-id=003 bgcolor=#E9E9E9
| 42003 ||  || — || December 30, 2000 || Socorro || LINEAR || — || align=right | 2.7 km || 
|-id=004 bgcolor=#fefefe
| 42004 ||  || — || December 30, 2000 || Socorro || LINEAR || — || align=right | 2.2 km || 
|-id=005 bgcolor=#E9E9E9
| 42005 ||  || — || December 30, 2000 || Socorro || LINEAR || PAD || align=right | 4.2 km || 
|-id=006 bgcolor=#fefefe
| 42006 ||  || — || December 30, 2000 || Socorro || LINEAR || — || align=right | 5.8 km || 
|-id=007 bgcolor=#E9E9E9
| 42007 ||  || — || December 30, 2000 || Socorro || LINEAR || — || align=right | 3.7 km || 
|-id=008 bgcolor=#fefefe
| 42008 ||  || — || December 30, 2000 || Socorro || LINEAR || — || align=right | 2.7 km || 
|-id=009 bgcolor=#d6d6d6
| 42009 ||  || — || December 30, 2000 || Socorro || LINEAR || — || align=right | 7.1 km || 
|-id=010 bgcolor=#E9E9E9
| 42010 ||  || — || December 30, 2000 || Socorro || LINEAR || — || align=right | 4.0 km || 
|-id=011 bgcolor=#fefefe
| 42011 ||  || — || December 30, 2000 || Socorro || LINEAR || — || align=right | 2.0 km || 
|-id=012 bgcolor=#d6d6d6
| 42012 ||  || — || December 30, 2000 || Socorro || LINEAR || EOS || align=right | 5.3 km || 
|-id=013 bgcolor=#E9E9E9
| 42013 ||  || — || December 30, 2000 || Socorro || LINEAR || — || align=right | 3.8 km || 
|-id=014 bgcolor=#d6d6d6
| 42014 ||  || — || December 30, 2000 || Socorro || LINEAR || EOS || align=right | 4.7 km || 
|-id=015 bgcolor=#d6d6d6
| 42015 ||  || — || December 16, 2000 || Kitt Peak || Spacewatch || — || align=right | 4.7 km || 
|-id=016 bgcolor=#fefefe
| 42016 ||  || — || December 30, 2000 || Socorro || LINEAR || V || align=right | 3.8 km || 
|-id=017 bgcolor=#fefefe
| 42017 ||  || — || December 30, 2000 || Socorro || LINEAR || V || align=right | 2.2 km || 
|-id=018 bgcolor=#E9E9E9
| 42018 ||  || — || December 30, 2000 || Socorro || LINEAR || — || align=right | 6.1 km || 
|-id=019 bgcolor=#fefefe
| 42019 ||  || — || December 30, 2000 || Socorro || LINEAR || — || align=right | 2.5 km || 
|-id=020 bgcolor=#fefefe
| 42020 ||  || — || December 30, 2000 || Socorro || LINEAR || — || align=right | 4.5 km || 
|-id=021 bgcolor=#d6d6d6
| 42021 ||  || — || December 30, 2000 || Socorro || LINEAR || — || align=right | 5.7 km || 
|-id=022 bgcolor=#E9E9E9
| 42022 ||  || — || December 30, 2000 || Socorro || LINEAR || — || align=right | 3.1 km || 
|-id=023 bgcolor=#fefefe
| 42023 ||  || — || December 30, 2000 || Socorro || LINEAR || — || align=right | 2.1 km || 
|-id=024 bgcolor=#E9E9E9
| 42024 ||  || — || December 30, 2000 || Socorro || LINEAR || — || align=right | 4.5 km || 
|-id=025 bgcolor=#fefefe
| 42025 ||  || — || December 30, 2000 || Socorro || LINEAR || NYS || align=right | 6.2 km || 
|-id=026 bgcolor=#E9E9E9
| 42026 ||  || — || December 30, 2000 || Socorro || LINEAR || — || align=right | 2.4 km || 
|-id=027 bgcolor=#fefefe
| 42027 ||  || — || December 30, 2000 || Socorro || LINEAR || V || align=right | 2.0 km || 
|-id=028 bgcolor=#fefefe
| 42028 ||  || — || December 30, 2000 || Socorro || LINEAR || V || align=right | 2.0 km || 
|-id=029 bgcolor=#d6d6d6
| 42029 ||  || — || December 30, 2000 || Socorro || LINEAR || THM || align=right | 7.6 km || 
|-id=030 bgcolor=#d6d6d6
| 42030 ||  || — || December 30, 2000 || Socorro || LINEAR || — || align=right | 6.9 km || 
|-id=031 bgcolor=#fefefe
| 42031 ||  || — || December 30, 2000 || Socorro || LINEAR || NYS || align=right | 1.7 km || 
|-id=032 bgcolor=#fefefe
| 42032 ||  || — || December 30, 2000 || Socorro || LINEAR || — || align=right | 3.7 km || 
|-id=033 bgcolor=#E9E9E9
| 42033 ||  || — || December 30, 2000 || Socorro || LINEAR || — || align=right | 2.7 km || 
|-id=034 bgcolor=#d6d6d6
| 42034 ||  || — || December 30, 2000 || Socorro || LINEAR || KOR || align=right | 3.9 km || 
|-id=035 bgcolor=#fefefe
| 42035 ||  || — || December 30, 2000 || Socorro || LINEAR || FLO || align=right | 2.8 km || 
|-id=036 bgcolor=#C2FFFF
| 42036 ||  || — || December 30, 2000 || Socorro || LINEAR || L4 || align=right | 23 km || 
|-id=037 bgcolor=#d6d6d6
| 42037 ||  || — || December 30, 2000 || Socorro || LINEAR || THM || align=right | 6.9 km || 
|-id=038 bgcolor=#E9E9E9
| 42038 ||  || — || December 30, 2000 || Socorro || LINEAR || — || align=right | 3.8 km || 
|-id=039 bgcolor=#E9E9E9
| 42039 ||  || — || December 30, 2000 || Socorro || LINEAR || — || align=right | 6.5 km || 
|-id=040 bgcolor=#d6d6d6
| 42040 ||  || — || December 30, 2000 || Socorro || LINEAR || — || align=right | 9.1 km || 
|-id=041 bgcolor=#d6d6d6
| 42041 ||  || — || December 30, 2000 || Socorro || LINEAR || — || align=right | 7.5 km || 
|-id=042 bgcolor=#E9E9E9
| 42042 ||  || — || December 28, 2000 || Socorro || LINEAR || — || align=right | 7.3 km || 
|-id=043 bgcolor=#d6d6d6
| 42043 ||  || — || December 28, 2000 || Socorro || LINEAR || — || align=right | 10 km || 
|-id=044 bgcolor=#E9E9E9
| 42044 ||  || — || December 28, 2000 || Socorro || LINEAR || — || align=right | 3.4 km || 
|-id=045 bgcolor=#d6d6d6
| 42045 ||  || — || December 28, 2000 || Socorro || LINEAR || — || align=right | 11 km || 
|-id=046 bgcolor=#fefefe
| 42046 ||  || — || December 28, 2000 || Socorro || LINEAR || — || align=right | 2.4 km || 
|-id=047 bgcolor=#E9E9E9
| 42047 ||  || — || December 28, 2000 || Socorro || LINEAR || — || align=right | 4.6 km || 
|-id=048 bgcolor=#d6d6d6
| 42048 ||  || — || December 30, 2000 || Socorro || LINEAR || — || align=right | 5.8 km || 
|-id=049 bgcolor=#E9E9E9
| 42049 ||  || — || December 30, 2000 || Socorro || LINEAR || — || align=right | 5.8 km || 
|-id=050 bgcolor=#d6d6d6
| 42050 ||  || — || December 30, 2000 || Socorro || LINEAR || EOS || align=right | 5.2 km || 
|-id=051 bgcolor=#fefefe
| 42051 ||  || — || December 30, 2000 || Socorro || LINEAR || V || align=right | 2.3 km || 
|-id=052 bgcolor=#E9E9E9
| 42052 ||  || — || December 30, 2000 || Socorro || LINEAR || — || align=right | 2.8 km || 
|-id=053 bgcolor=#fefefe
| 42053 ||  || — || December 30, 2000 || Socorro || LINEAR || — || align=right | 3.2 km || 
|-id=054 bgcolor=#fefefe
| 42054 ||  || — || December 30, 2000 || Socorro || LINEAR || — || align=right | 3.8 km || 
|-id=055 bgcolor=#fefefe
| 42055 ||  || — || December 30, 2000 || Socorro || LINEAR || — || align=right | 2.6 km || 
|-id=056 bgcolor=#d6d6d6
| 42056 ||  || — || December 30, 2000 || Socorro || LINEAR || — || align=right | 5.8 km || 
|-id=057 bgcolor=#E9E9E9
| 42057 ||  || — || December 30, 2000 || Socorro || LINEAR || — || align=right | 4.0 km || 
|-id=058 bgcolor=#d6d6d6
| 42058 ||  || — || December 30, 2000 || Socorro || LINEAR || KOR || align=right | 3.7 km || 
|-id=059 bgcolor=#E9E9E9
| 42059 ||  || — || December 30, 2000 || Socorro || LINEAR || — || align=right | 2.8 km || 
|-id=060 bgcolor=#E9E9E9
| 42060 ||  || — || December 30, 2000 || Socorro || LINEAR || — || align=right | 4.2 km || 
|-id=061 bgcolor=#fefefe
| 42061 ||  || — || December 30, 2000 || Socorro || LINEAR || NYS || align=right | 2.2 km || 
|-id=062 bgcolor=#E9E9E9
| 42062 ||  || — || December 28, 2000 || Socorro || LINEAR || EUN || align=right | 3.4 km || 
|-id=063 bgcolor=#fefefe
| 42063 ||  || — || December 28, 2000 || Socorro || LINEAR || — || align=right | 3.4 km || 
|-id=064 bgcolor=#E9E9E9
| 42064 ||  || — || December 29, 2000 || Haleakala || NEAT || — || align=right | 4.7 km || 
|-id=065 bgcolor=#E9E9E9
| 42065 ||  || — || December 29, 2000 || Haleakala || NEAT || — || align=right | 3.9 km || 
|-id=066 bgcolor=#fefefe
| 42066 ||  || — || December 29, 2000 || Haleakala || NEAT || — || align=right | 3.1 km || 
|-id=067 bgcolor=#d6d6d6
| 42067 ||  || — || December 30, 2000 || Socorro || LINEAR || — || align=right | 6.1 km || 
|-id=068 bgcolor=#d6d6d6
| 42068 ||  || — || December 30, 2000 || Anderson Mesa || LONEOS || 7:4 || align=right | 15 km || 
|-id=069 bgcolor=#fefefe
| 42069 ||  || — || December 17, 2000 || Anderson Mesa || LONEOS || — || align=right | 2.8 km || 
|-id=070 bgcolor=#d6d6d6
| 42070 ||  || — || December 23, 2000 || Socorro || LINEAR || — || align=right | 8.9 km || 
|-id=071 bgcolor=#E9E9E9
| 42071 ||  || — || December 23, 2000 || Kitt Peak || Spacewatch || — || align=right | 3.8 km || 
|-id=072 bgcolor=#fefefe
| 42072 ||  || — || December 27, 2000 || Kitt Peak || Spacewatch || NYS || align=right | 1.6 km || 
|-id=073 bgcolor=#d6d6d6
| 42073 Noreen ||  ||  || January 2, 2001 || Carbuncle Hill || D. P. Pray || — || align=right | 9.5 km || 
|-id=074 bgcolor=#E9E9E9
| 42074 ||  || — || January 2, 2001 || Kitt Peak || Spacewatch || — || align=right | 3.3 km || 
|-id=075 bgcolor=#E9E9E9
| 42075 ||  || — || January 2, 2001 || Socorro || LINEAR || GEF || align=right | 3.9 km || 
|-id=076 bgcolor=#d6d6d6
| 42076 ||  || — || January 2, 2001 || Socorro || LINEAR || LUT || align=right | 10 km || 
|-id=077 bgcolor=#E9E9E9
| 42077 ||  || — || January 2, 2001 || Socorro || LINEAR || — || align=right | 4.4 km || 
|-id=078 bgcolor=#E9E9E9
| 42078 ||  || — || January 2, 2001 || Socorro || LINEAR || — || align=right | 3.3 km || 
|-id=079 bgcolor=#fefefe
| 42079 ||  || — || January 2, 2001 || Socorro || LINEAR || — || align=right | 2.4 km || 
|-id=080 bgcolor=#E9E9E9
| 42080 ||  || — || January 2, 2001 || Socorro || LINEAR || MAR || align=right | 2.9 km || 
|-id=081 bgcolor=#fefefe
| 42081 ||  || — || January 2, 2001 || Socorro || LINEAR || — || align=right | 2.3 km || 
|-id=082 bgcolor=#d6d6d6
| 42082 ||  || — || January 2, 2001 || Socorro || LINEAR || ALA || align=right | 13 km || 
|-id=083 bgcolor=#d6d6d6
| 42083 ||  || — || January 2, 2001 || Socorro || LINEAR || — || align=right | 6.1 km || 
|-id=084 bgcolor=#E9E9E9
| 42084 ||  || — || January 2, 2001 || Socorro || LINEAR || — || align=right | 3.5 km || 
|-id=085 bgcolor=#fefefe
| 42085 ||  || — || January 2, 2001 || Socorro || LINEAR || FLO || align=right | 2.0 km || 
|-id=086 bgcolor=#E9E9E9
| 42086 ||  || — || January 2, 2001 || Socorro || LINEAR || — || align=right | 2.0 km || 
|-id=087 bgcolor=#d6d6d6
| 42087 ||  || — || January 2, 2001 || Socorro || LINEAR || TEL || align=right | 3.6 km || 
|-id=088 bgcolor=#d6d6d6
| 42088 ||  || — || January 2, 2001 || Socorro || LINEAR || — || align=right | 6.4 km || 
|-id=089 bgcolor=#d6d6d6
| 42089 ||  || — || January 2, 2001 || Socorro || LINEAR || LIX || align=right | 9.0 km || 
|-id=090 bgcolor=#fefefe
| 42090 ||  || — || January 2, 2001 || Socorro || LINEAR || — || align=right | 2.1 km || 
|-id=091 bgcolor=#E9E9E9
| 42091 ||  || — || January 2, 2001 || Socorro || LINEAR || HNS || align=right | 4.2 km || 
|-id=092 bgcolor=#fefefe
| 42092 ||  || — || January 3, 2001 || Socorro || LINEAR || — || align=right | 2.2 km || 
|-id=093 bgcolor=#E9E9E9
| 42093 ||  || — || January 3, 2001 || Socorro || LINEAR || GEF || align=right | 3.1 km || 
|-id=094 bgcolor=#fefefe
| 42094 ||  || — || January 4, 2001 || Socorro || LINEAR || — || align=right | 3.2 km || 
|-id=095 bgcolor=#E9E9E9
| 42095 ||  || — || January 6, 2001 || Farpoint || Farpoint Obs. || — || align=right | 6.3 km || 
|-id=096 bgcolor=#d6d6d6
| 42096 ||  || — || January 6, 2001 || Farpoint || Farpoint Obs. || TEL || align=right | 4.7 km || 
|-id=097 bgcolor=#E9E9E9
| 42097 ||  || — || January 5, 2001 || Socorro || LINEAR || — || align=right | 3.3 km || 
|-id=098 bgcolor=#fefefe
| 42098 ||  || — || January 4, 2001 || Socorro || LINEAR || — || align=right | 2.6 km || 
|-id=099 bgcolor=#E9E9E9
| 42099 ||  || — || January 4, 2001 || Socorro || LINEAR || — || align=right | 2.6 km || 
|-id=100 bgcolor=#E9E9E9
| 42100 ||  || — || January 4, 2001 || Socorro || LINEAR || — || align=right | 2.8 km || 
|}

42101–42200 

|-bgcolor=#E9E9E9
| 42101 ||  || — || January 4, 2001 || Socorro || LINEAR || — || align=right | 2.8 km || 
|-id=102 bgcolor=#E9E9E9
| 42102 ||  || — || January 4, 2001 || Socorro || LINEAR || — || align=right | 4.7 km || 
|-id=103 bgcolor=#d6d6d6
| 42103 ||  || — || January 4, 2001 || Socorro || LINEAR || — || align=right | 8.5 km || 
|-id=104 bgcolor=#d6d6d6
| 42104 ||  || — || January 5, 2001 || Socorro || LINEAR || EOS || align=right | 5.3 km || 
|-id=105 bgcolor=#d6d6d6
| 42105 ||  || — || January 5, 2001 || Socorro || LINEAR || EOS || align=right | 5.4 km || 
|-id=106 bgcolor=#d6d6d6
| 42106 ||  || — || January 5, 2001 || Socorro || LINEAR || — || align=right | 4.3 km || 
|-id=107 bgcolor=#fefefe
| 42107 ||  || — || January 5, 2001 || Socorro || LINEAR || — || align=right | 3.5 km || 
|-id=108 bgcolor=#d6d6d6
| 42108 ||  || — || January 3, 2001 || Socorro || LINEAR || — || align=right | 7.4 km || 
|-id=109 bgcolor=#fefefe
| 42109 ||  || — || January 15, 2001 || Oizumi || T. Kobayashi || NYS || align=right | 4.5 km || 
|-id=110 bgcolor=#fefefe
| 42110 ||  || — || January 15, 2001 || Oizumi || T. Kobayashi || — || align=right | 2.8 km || 
|-id=111 bgcolor=#fefefe
| 42111 ||  || — || January 15, 2001 || Socorro || LINEAR || PHO || align=right | 3.1 km || 
|-id=112 bgcolor=#d6d6d6
| 42112 Hongkyumoon ||  ||  || January 4, 2001 || Anderson Mesa || LONEOS || PAL || align=right | 11 km || 
|-id=113 bgcolor=#E9E9E9
| 42113 Jura ||  ||  || January 15, 2001 || Vicques || Jura Obs. || — || align=right | 4.5 km || 
|-id=114 bgcolor=#C2FFFF
| 42114 ||  || — || January 18, 2001 || Socorro || LINEAR || L4 || align=right | 18 km || 
|-id=115 bgcolor=#E9E9E9
| 42115 ||  || — || January 18, 2001 || Socorro || LINEAR || — || align=right | 3.6 km || 
|-id=116 bgcolor=#fefefe
| 42116 ||  || — || January 18, 2001 || Socorro || LINEAR || V || align=right | 1.7 km || 
|-id=117 bgcolor=#d6d6d6
| 42117 ||  || — || January 19, 2001 || Socorro || LINEAR || — || align=right | 8.9 km || 
|-id=118 bgcolor=#fefefe
| 42118 ||  || — || January 19, 2001 || Socorro || LINEAR || — || align=right | 2.4 km || 
|-id=119 bgcolor=#d6d6d6
| 42119 ||  || — || January 19, 2001 || Socorro || LINEAR || — || align=right | 7.9 km || 
|-id=120 bgcolor=#E9E9E9
| 42120 ||  || — || January 19, 2001 || Socorro || LINEAR || — || align=right | 4.4 km || 
|-id=121 bgcolor=#fefefe
| 42121 ||  || — || January 19, 2001 || Socorro || LINEAR || — || align=right | 2.5 km || 
|-id=122 bgcolor=#fefefe
| 42122 ||  || — || January 19, 2001 || Socorro || LINEAR || — || align=right | 5.9 km || 
|-id=123 bgcolor=#d6d6d6
| 42123 ||  || — || January 19, 2001 || Socorro || LINEAR || HYG || align=right | 5.9 km || 
|-id=124 bgcolor=#d6d6d6
| 42124 ||  || — || January 19, 2001 || Socorro || LINEAR || — || align=right | 8.7 km || 
|-id=125 bgcolor=#E9E9E9
| 42125 ||  || — || January 21, 2001 || Socorro || LINEAR || — || align=right | 3.9 km || 
|-id=126 bgcolor=#d6d6d6
| 42126 ||  || — || January 21, 2001 || Oizumi || T. Kobayashi || THM || align=right | 7.7 km || 
|-id=127 bgcolor=#d6d6d6
| 42127 ||  || — || January 21, 2001 || Oizumi || T. Kobayashi || — || align=right | 7.9 km || 
|-id=128 bgcolor=#E9E9E9
| 42128 ||  || — || January 21, 2001 || Oizumi || T. Kobayashi || EUN || align=right | 4.5 km || 
|-id=129 bgcolor=#E9E9E9
| 42129 ||  || — || January 19, 2001 || Socorro || LINEAR || — || align=right | 7.4 km || 
|-id=130 bgcolor=#d6d6d6
| 42130 ||  || — || January 19, 2001 || Socorro || LINEAR || — || align=right | 4.7 km || 
|-id=131 bgcolor=#d6d6d6
| 42131 ||  || — || January 19, 2001 || Socorro || LINEAR || — || align=right | 7.5 km || 
|-id=132 bgcolor=#d6d6d6
| 42132 ||  || — || January 20, 2001 || Socorro || LINEAR || — || align=right | 9.5 km || 
|-id=133 bgcolor=#d6d6d6
| 42133 ||  || — || January 20, 2001 || Socorro || LINEAR || KOR || align=right | 4.1 km || 
|-id=134 bgcolor=#d6d6d6
| 42134 ||  || — || January 20, 2001 || Socorro || LINEAR || — || align=right | 6.2 km || 
|-id=135 bgcolor=#d6d6d6
| 42135 ||  || — || January 20, 2001 || Socorro || LINEAR || — || align=right | 12 km || 
|-id=136 bgcolor=#d6d6d6
| 42136 ||  || — || January 20, 2001 || Socorro || LINEAR || — || align=right | 7.3 km || 
|-id=137 bgcolor=#d6d6d6
| 42137 ||  || — || January 20, 2001 || Socorro || LINEAR || — || align=right | 8.8 km || 
|-id=138 bgcolor=#d6d6d6
| 42138 ||  || — || January 20, 2001 || Socorro || LINEAR || — || align=right | 10 km || 
|-id=139 bgcolor=#d6d6d6
| 42139 ||  || — || January 20, 2001 || Socorro || LINEAR || EOS || align=right | 5.4 km || 
|-id=140 bgcolor=#E9E9E9
| 42140 ||  || — || January 20, 2001 || Socorro || LINEAR || — || align=right | 6.6 km || 
|-id=141 bgcolor=#d6d6d6
| 42141 ||  || — || January 20, 2001 || Socorro || LINEAR || — || align=right | 7.6 km || 
|-id=142 bgcolor=#d6d6d6
| 42142 ||  || — || January 20, 2001 || Socorro || LINEAR || — || align=right | 9.2 km || 
|-id=143 bgcolor=#E9E9E9
| 42143 ||  || — || January 21, 2001 || Socorro || LINEAR || EUN || align=right | 3.0 km || 
|-id=144 bgcolor=#E9E9E9
| 42144 ||  || — || January 24, 2001 || Socorro || LINEAR || MIT || align=right | 7.6 km || 
|-id=145 bgcolor=#d6d6d6
| 42145 ||  || — || January 24, 2001 || Socorro || LINEAR || EOS || align=right | 4.5 km || 
|-id=146 bgcolor=#C2FFFF
| 42146 ||  || — || January 19, 2001 || Socorro || LINEAR || L4 || align=right | 22 km || 
|-id=147 bgcolor=#d6d6d6
| 42147 ||  || — || January 19, 2001 || Socorro || LINEAR || — || align=right | 9.1 km || 
|-id=148 bgcolor=#E9E9E9
| 42148 ||  || — || January 21, 2001 || Socorro || LINEAR || — || align=right | 2.5 km || 
|-id=149 bgcolor=#d6d6d6
| 42149 ||  || — || January 21, 2001 || Socorro || LINEAR || EOS || align=right | 3.6 km || 
|-id=150 bgcolor=#d6d6d6
| 42150 ||  || — || January 17, 2001 || Haleakala || NEAT || HYG || align=right | 7.5 km || 
|-id=151 bgcolor=#d6d6d6
| 42151 ||  || — || January 18, 2001 || Kitt Peak || Spacewatch || — || align=right | 9.0 km || 
|-id=152 bgcolor=#d6d6d6
| 42152 ||  || — || January 21, 2001 || Socorro || LINEAR || KOR || align=right | 3.3 km || 
|-id=153 bgcolor=#E9E9E9
| 42153 ||  || — || January 21, 2001 || Socorro || LINEAR || — || align=right | 5.7 km || 
|-id=154 bgcolor=#d6d6d6
| 42154 ||  || — || January 29, 2001 || Socorro || LINEAR || — || align=right | 8.7 km || 
|-id=155 bgcolor=#fefefe
| 42155 ||  || — || January 29, 2001 || Socorro || LINEAR || ERI || align=right | 5.7 km || 
|-id=156 bgcolor=#E9E9E9
| 42156 ||  || — || January 29, 2001 || Socorro || LINEAR || — || align=right | 2.7 km || 
|-id=157 bgcolor=#d6d6d6
| 42157 ||  || — || January 29, 2001 || Socorro || LINEAR || — || align=right | 5.9 km || 
|-id=158 bgcolor=#E9E9E9
| 42158 ||  || — || January 29, 2001 || Socorro || LINEAR || MRX || align=right | 3.1 km || 
|-id=159 bgcolor=#d6d6d6
| 42159 ||  || — || January 27, 2001 || Haleakala || NEAT || — || align=right | 10 km || 
|-id=160 bgcolor=#d6d6d6
| 42160 ||  || — || January 28, 2001 || Haleakala || NEAT || ALA || align=right | 6.6 km || 
|-id=161 bgcolor=#d6d6d6
| 42161 ||  || — || January 31, 2001 || Socorro || LINEAR || THM || align=right | 6.2 km || 
|-id=162 bgcolor=#d6d6d6
| 42162 ||  || — || January 26, 2001 || Socorro || LINEAR || — || align=right | 4.2 km || 
|-id=163 bgcolor=#fefefe
| 42163 ||  || — || January 26, 2001 || Socorro || LINEAR || — || align=right | 2.3 km || 
|-id=164 bgcolor=#d6d6d6
| 42164 || 2001 CT || — || February 1, 2001 || Socorro || LINEAR || — || align=right | 8.1 km || 
|-id=165 bgcolor=#E9E9E9
| 42165 ||  || — || February 1, 2001 || Socorro || LINEAR || EUN || align=right | 2.2 km || 
|-id=166 bgcolor=#fefefe
| 42166 ||  || — || February 1, 2001 || Socorro || LINEAR || MAS || align=right | 2.1 km || 
|-id=167 bgcolor=#d6d6d6
| 42167 ||  || — || February 1, 2001 || Socorro || LINEAR || 3:2 || align=right | 12 km || 
|-id=168 bgcolor=#C2FFFF
| 42168 ||  || — || February 1, 2001 || Socorro || LINEAR || L4 || align=right | 19 km || 
|-id=169 bgcolor=#d6d6d6
| 42169 ||  || — || February 1, 2001 || Socorro || LINEAR || — || align=right | 4.3 km || 
|-id=170 bgcolor=#E9E9E9
| 42170 ||  || — || February 1, 2001 || Socorro || LINEAR || EUN || align=right | 3.2 km || 
|-id=171 bgcolor=#E9E9E9
| 42171 ||  || — || February 1, 2001 || Socorro || LINEAR || — || align=right | 3.5 km || 
|-id=172 bgcolor=#d6d6d6
| 42172 ||  || — || February 1, 2001 || Socorro || LINEAR || 7:4 || align=right | 7.7 km || 
|-id=173 bgcolor=#fefefe
| 42173 ||  || — || February 2, 2001 || Socorro || LINEAR || PHO || align=right | 2.8 km || 
|-id=174 bgcolor=#fefefe
| 42174 ||  || — || February 1, 2001 || Anderson Mesa || LONEOS || — || align=right | 3.3 km || 
|-id=175 bgcolor=#d6d6d6
| 42175 Yuyang ||  ||  || February 1, 2001 || Anderson Mesa || LONEOS || HYG || align=right | 5.2 km || 
|-id=176 bgcolor=#C2FFFF
| 42176 ||  || — || February 1, 2001 || Anderson Mesa || LONEOS || L4 || align=right | 19 km || 
|-id=177 bgcolor=#fefefe
| 42177 Bolin ||  ||  || February 1, 2001 || Anderson Mesa || LONEOS || NYS || align=right | 2.2 km || 
|-id=178 bgcolor=#E9E9E9
| 42178 ||  || — || February 1, 2001 || Socorro || LINEAR || — || align=right | 5.6 km || 
|-id=179 bgcolor=#C2FFFF
| 42179 ||  || — || February 1, 2001 || Socorro || LINEAR || L4 || align=right | 15 km || 
|-id=180 bgcolor=#d6d6d6
| 42180 ||  || — || February 1, 2001 || Socorro || LINEAR || — || align=right | 12 km || 
|-id=181 bgcolor=#fefefe
| 42181 ||  || — || February 2, 2001 || Anderson Mesa || LONEOS || — || align=right | 2.2 km || 
|-id=182 bgcolor=#C2FFFF
| 42182 ||  || — || February 2, 2001 || Anderson Mesa || LONEOS || L4 || align=right | 18 km || 
|-id=183 bgcolor=#d6d6d6
| 42183 Tubiana ||  ||  || February 2, 2001 || Anderson Mesa || LONEOS || HYG || align=right | 6.0 km || 
|-id=184 bgcolor=#d6d6d6
| 42184 ||  || — || February 2, 2001 || Haleakala || NEAT || EOS || align=right | 6.6 km || 
|-id=185 bgcolor=#d6d6d6
| 42185 ||  || — || February 2, 2001 || Haleakala || NEAT || EOS || align=right | 5.9 km || 
|-id=186 bgcolor=#d6d6d6
| 42186 ||  || — || February 11, 2001 || Črni Vrh || Črni Vrh || — || align=right | 12 km || 
|-id=187 bgcolor=#C2FFFF
| 42187 ||  || — || February 13, 2001 || Socorro || LINEAR || L4 || align=right | 38 km || 
|-id=188 bgcolor=#E9E9E9
| 42188 ||  || — || February 13, 2001 || Socorro || LINEAR || WAT || align=right | 5.6 km || 
|-id=189 bgcolor=#d6d6d6
| 42189 ||  || — || February 13, 2001 || Socorro || LINEAR || — || align=right | 9.9 km || 
|-id=190 bgcolor=#d6d6d6
| 42190 ||  || — || February 15, 2001 || Oizumi || T. Kobayashi || HIL3:2 || align=right | 12 km || 
|-id=191 bgcolor=#E9E9E9
| 42191 Thurmann ||  ||  || February 14, 2001 || Vicques || Jura Obs. || RAF || align=right | 2.3 km || 
|-id=192 bgcolor=#E9E9E9
| 42192 ||  || — || February 13, 2001 || Socorro || LINEAR || — || align=right | 3.4 km || 
|-id=193 bgcolor=#d6d6d6
| 42193 ||  || — || February 15, 2001 || Socorro || LINEAR || ALA || align=right | 10 km || 
|-id=194 bgcolor=#d6d6d6
| 42194 ||  || — || February 17, 2001 || Socorro || LINEAR || — || align=right | 11 km || 
|-id=195 bgcolor=#d6d6d6
| 42195 ||  || — || February 16, 2001 || Socorro || LINEAR || MELslow || align=right | 11 km || 
|-id=196 bgcolor=#d6d6d6
| 42196 ||  || — || February 16, 2001 || Socorro || LINEAR || EOS || align=right | 7.1 km || 
|-id=197 bgcolor=#d6d6d6
| 42197 ||  || — || February 17, 2001 || Socorro || LINEAR || EOS || align=right | 4.9 km || 
|-id=198 bgcolor=#d6d6d6
| 42198 ||  || — || February 17, 2001 || Socorro || LINEAR || EOS || align=right | 4.3 km || 
|-id=199 bgcolor=#d6d6d6
| 42199 ||  || — || February 17, 2001 || Socorro || LINEAR || — || align=right | 7.7 km || 
|-id=200 bgcolor=#C2FFFF
| 42200 ||  || — || February 17, 2001 || Socorro || LINEAR || L4 || align=right | 16 km || 
|}

42201–42300 

|-bgcolor=#C2FFFF
| 42201 ||  || — || February 17, 2001 || Socorro || LINEAR || L4 || align=right | 18 km || 
|-id=202 bgcolor=#d6d6d6
| 42202 ||  || — || February 17, 2001 || Socorro || LINEAR || — || align=right | 7.0 km || 
|-id=203 bgcolor=#d6d6d6
| 42203 ||  || — || February 19, 2001 || Socorro || LINEAR || — || align=right | 5.7 km || 
|-id=204 bgcolor=#d6d6d6
| 42204 ||  || — || February 19, 2001 || Socorro || LINEAR || — || align=right | 6.9 km || 
|-id=205 bgcolor=#E9E9E9
| 42205 ||  || — || February 19, 2001 || Socorro || LINEAR || WIT || align=right | 3.1 km || 
|-id=206 bgcolor=#d6d6d6
| 42206 ||  || — || February 19, 2001 || Socorro || LINEAR || — || align=right | 8.0 km || 
|-id=207 bgcolor=#d6d6d6
| 42207 ||  || — || February 19, 2001 || Socorro || LINEAR || KOR || align=right | 3.3 km || 
|-id=208 bgcolor=#d6d6d6
| 42208 ||  || — || February 19, 2001 || Haleakala || NEAT || — || align=right | 12 km || 
|-id=209 bgcolor=#d6d6d6
| 42209 ||  || — || February 16, 2001 || Socorro || LINEAR || — || align=right | 8.5 km || 
|-id=210 bgcolor=#d6d6d6
| 42210 ||  || — || February 16, 2001 || Socorro || LINEAR || EOS || align=right | 5.8 km || 
|-id=211 bgcolor=#d6d6d6
| 42211 ||  || — || February 16, 2001 || Socorro || LINEAR || EOS || align=right | 5.7 km || 
|-id=212 bgcolor=#d6d6d6
| 42212 ||  || — || February 16, 2001 || Socorro || LINEAR || — || align=right | 9.1 km || 
|-id=213 bgcolor=#fefefe
| 42213 ||  || — || February 16, 2001 || Socorro || LINEAR || — || align=right | 3.0 km || 
|-id=214 bgcolor=#d6d6d6
| 42214 ||  || — || February 16, 2001 || Socorro || LINEAR || URS || align=right | 9.5 km || 
|-id=215 bgcolor=#d6d6d6
| 42215 ||  || — || February 17, 2001 || Socorro || LINEAR || — || align=right | 8.7 km || 
|-id=216 bgcolor=#E9E9E9
| 42216 ||  || — || February 17, 2001 || Socorro || LINEAR || — || align=right | 3.6 km || 
|-id=217 bgcolor=#d6d6d6
| 42217 ||  || — || February 19, 2001 || Socorro || LINEAR || — || align=right | 4.1 km || 
|-id=218 bgcolor=#d6d6d6
| 42218 ||  || — || February 17, 2001 || Socorro || LINEAR || VER || align=right | 7.3 km || 
|-id=219 bgcolor=#E9E9E9
| 42219 ||  || — || February 19, 2001 || Socorro || LINEAR || — || align=right | 3.2 km || 
|-id=220 bgcolor=#d6d6d6
| 42220 ||  || — || February 19, 2001 || Socorro || LINEAR || — || align=right | 6.7 km || 
|-id=221 bgcolor=#d6d6d6
| 42221 ||  || — || February 19, 2001 || Socorro || LINEAR || — || align=right | 4.2 km || 
|-id=222 bgcolor=#d6d6d6
| 42222 ||  || — || February 19, 2001 || Socorro || LINEAR || — || align=right | 7.6 km || 
|-id=223 bgcolor=#d6d6d6
| 42223 ||  || — || February 19, 2001 || Socorro || LINEAR || — || align=right | 5.7 km || 
|-id=224 bgcolor=#d6d6d6
| 42224 ||  || — || February 19, 2001 || Socorro || LINEAR || — || align=right | 7.9 km || 
|-id=225 bgcolor=#d6d6d6
| 42225 ||  || — || February 19, 2001 || Socorro || LINEAR || VER || align=right | 7.0 km || 
|-id=226 bgcolor=#d6d6d6
| 42226 ||  || — || February 26, 2001 || Oizumi || T. Kobayashi || EOS || align=right | 5.4 km || 
|-id=227 bgcolor=#d6d6d6
| 42227 ||  || — || February 19, 2001 || Socorro || LINEAR || EOS || align=right | 4.9 km || 
|-id=228 bgcolor=#d6d6d6
| 42228 ||  || — || February 18, 2001 || Haleakala || NEAT || — || align=right | 9.8 km || 
|-id=229 bgcolor=#d6d6d6
| 42229 ||  || — || February 17, 2001 || Socorro || LINEAR || ALA || align=right | 12 km || 
|-id=230 bgcolor=#C2FFFF
| 42230 ||  || — || February 19, 2001 || Anderson Mesa || LONEOS || L4 || align=right | 13 km || 
|-id=231 bgcolor=#d6d6d6
| 42231 ||  || — || March 1, 2001 || Socorro || LINEAR || — || align=right | 7.5 km || 
|-id=232 bgcolor=#d6d6d6
| 42232 ||  || — || March 1, 2001 || Socorro || LINEAR || — || align=right | 10 km || 
|-id=233 bgcolor=#d6d6d6
| 42233 ||  || — || March 1, 2001 || Socorro || LINEAR || — || align=right | 7.9 km || 
|-id=234 bgcolor=#E9E9E9
| 42234 ||  || — || March 1, 2001 || Socorro || LINEAR || — || align=right | 7.4 km || 
|-id=235 bgcolor=#E9E9E9
| 42235 ||  || — || March 2, 2001 || Anderson Mesa || LONEOS || — || align=right | 3.5 km || 
|-id=236 bgcolor=#d6d6d6
| 42236 ||  || — || March 15, 2001 || Anderson Mesa || LONEOS || — || align=right | 7.3 km || 
|-id=237 bgcolor=#d6d6d6
| 42237 ||  || — || March 15, 2001 || Anderson Mesa || LONEOS || HIL3:2 || align=right | 18 km || 
|-id=238 bgcolor=#E9E9E9
| 42238 ||  || — || March 19, 2001 || Oizumi || T. Kobayashi || — || align=right | 3.1 km || 
|-id=239 bgcolor=#E9E9E9
| 42239 ||  || — || March 19, 2001 || Anderson Mesa || LONEOS || — || align=right | 8.2 km || 
|-id=240 bgcolor=#d6d6d6
| 42240 ||  || — || March 18, 2001 || Socorro || LINEAR || HYG || align=right | 9.0 km || 
|-id=241 bgcolor=#E9E9E9
| 42241 ||  || — || March 18, 2001 || Socorro || LINEAR || EUN || align=right | 2.5 km || 
|-id=242 bgcolor=#d6d6d6
| 42242 ||  || — || March 19, 2001 || Socorro || LINEAR || EOS || align=right | 5.6 km || 
|-id=243 bgcolor=#d6d6d6
| 42243 ||  || — || March 19, 2001 || Socorro || LINEAR || ALA || align=right | 7.8 km || 
|-id=244 bgcolor=#d6d6d6
| 42244 ||  || — || March 19, 2001 || Socorro || LINEAR || CHA || align=right | 3.2 km || 
|-id=245 bgcolor=#E9E9E9
| 42245 ||  || — || March 21, 2001 || Anderson Mesa || LONEOS || — || align=right | 7.6 km || 
|-id=246 bgcolor=#E9E9E9
| 42246 ||  || — || March 29, 2001 || Desert Beaver || W. K. Y. Yeung || — || align=right | 2.8 km || 
|-id=247 bgcolor=#E9E9E9
| 42247 ||  || — || March 26, 2001 || Haleakala || NEAT || — || align=right | 5.6 km || 
|-id=248 bgcolor=#E9E9E9
| 42248 ||  || — || March 18, 2001 || Anderson Mesa || LONEOS || — || align=right | 4.7 km || 
|-id=249 bgcolor=#fefefe
| 42249 ||  || — || April 27, 2001 || Socorro || LINEAR || — || align=right | 2.4 km || 
|-id=250 bgcolor=#d6d6d6
| 42250 ||  || — || May 18, 2001 || Socorro || LINEAR || — || align=right | 14 km || 
|-id=251 bgcolor=#fefefe
| 42251 || 2001 LA || — || June 1, 2001 || Socorro || LINEAR || PHO || align=right | 3.2 km || 
|-id=252 bgcolor=#E9E9E9
| 42252 ||  || — || June 13, 2001 || Socorro || LINEAR || MAR || align=right | 4.3 km || 
|-id=253 bgcolor=#fefefe
| 42253 ||  || — || July 13, 2001 || Haleakala || NEAT || — || align=right | 2.1 km || 
|-id=254 bgcolor=#fefefe
| 42254 ||  || — || July 14, 2001 || Palomar || NEAT || NYS || align=right | 1.3 km || 
|-id=255 bgcolor=#fefefe
| 42255 ||  || — || July 18, 2001 || Palomar || NEAT || FLO || align=right | 1.6 km || 
|-id=256 bgcolor=#fefefe
| 42256 ||  || — || July 20, 2001 || Anderson Mesa || LONEOS || FLO || align=right | 2.5 km || 
|-id=257 bgcolor=#E9E9E9
| 42257 ||  || — || July 16, 2001 || Haleakala || NEAT || — || align=right | 3.3 km || 
|-id=258 bgcolor=#fefefe
| 42258 ||  || — || July 17, 2001 || Haleakala || NEAT || NYS || align=right | 3.1 km || 
|-id=259 bgcolor=#d6d6d6
| 42259 ||  || — || July 29, 2001 || Socorro || LINEAR || EOS || align=right | 9.9 km || 
|-id=260 bgcolor=#E9E9E9
| 42260 ||  || — || July 27, 2001 || Palomar || NEAT || MAR || align=right | 4.8 km || 
|-id=261 bgcolor=#E9E9E9
| 42261 ||  || — || July 22, 2001 || Palomar || NEAT || — || align=right | 3.7 km || 
|-id=262 bgcolor=#E9E9E9
| 42262 ||  || — || August 10, 2001 || Haleakala || NEAT || GEF || align=right | 4.2 km || 
|-id=263 bgcolor=#E9E9E9
| 42263 ||  || — || August 11, 2001 || Palomar || NEAT || GEF || align=right | 4.7 km || 
|-id=264 bgcolor=#E9E9E9
| 42264 ||  || — || August 16, 2001 || Socorro || LINEAR || MAR || align=right | 5.9 km || 
|-id=265 bgcolor=#d6d6d6
| 42265 ||  || — || August 17, 2001 || Socorro || LINEAR || EOS || align=right | 6.7 km || 
|-id=266 bgcolor=#fefefe
| 42266 ||  || — || August 16, 2001 || Socorro || LINEAR || FLO || align=right | 2.9 km || 
|-id=267 bgcolor=#E9E9E9
| 42267 ||  || — || August 17, 2001 || Socorro || LINEAR || — || align=right | 4.4 km || 
|-id=268 bgcolor=#E9E9E9
| 42268 ||  || — || August 16, 2001 || Socorro || LINEAR || — || align=right | 7.5 km || 
|-id=269 bgcolor=#E9E9E9
| 42269 ||  || — || August 17, 2001 || Socorro || LINEAR || — || align=right | 6.1 km || 
|-id=270 bgcolor=#E9E9E9
| 42270 ||  || — || August 22, 2001 || Socorro || LINEAR || PAE || align=right | 7.0 km || 
|-id=271 bgcolor=#E9E9E9
| 42271 Keikokubota ||  ||  || August 24, 2001 || Goodricke-Pigott || R. A. Tucker || — || align=right | 4.2 km || 
|-id=272 bgcolor=#fefefe
| 42272 ||  || — || August 28, 2001 || Palomar || NEAT || — || align=right | 4.6 km || 
|-id=273 bgcolor=#E9E9E9
| 42273 ||  || — || August 24, 2001 || Anderson Mesa || LONEOS || — || align=right | 14 km || 
|-id=274 bgcolor=#fefefe
| 42274 ||  || — || August 25, 2001 || Socorro || LINEAR || — || align=right | 1.6 km || 
|-id=275 bgcolor=#fefefe
| 42275 ||  || — || September 11, 2001 || Desert Eagle || W. K. Y. Yeung || — || align=right | 1.2 km || 
|-id=276 bgcolor=#d6d6d6
| 42276 ||  || — || September 16, 2001 || Socorro || LINEAR || EOS || align=right | 4.4 km || 
|-id=277 bgcolor=#C2FFFF
| 42277 ||  || — || September 16, 2001 || Socorro || LINEAR || L5 || align=right | 20 km || 
|-id=278 bgcolor=#d6d6d6
| 42278 ||  || — || September 25, 2001 || Desert Eagle || W. K. Y. Yeung || EOS || align=right | 5.4 km || 
|-id=279 bgcolor=#E9E9E9
| 42279 ||  || — || September 25, 2001 || Desert Eagle || W. K. Y. Yeung || — || align=right | 4.8 km || 
|-id=280 bgcolor=#fefefe
| 42280 ||  || — || September 25, 2001 || Desert Eagle || W. K. Y. Yeung || — || align=right | 3.1 km || 
|-id=281 bgcolor=#E9E9E9
| 42281 ||  || — || September 25, 2001 || Desert Eagle || W. K. Y. Yeung || — || align=right | 3.8 km || 
|-id=282 bgcolor=#E9E9E9
| 42282 ||  || — || September 22, 2001 || Socorro || LINEAR || EUNslow || align=right | 4.1 km || 
|-id=283 bgcolor=#E9E9E9
| 42283 ||  || — || September 25, 2001 || Socorro || LINEAR || — || align=right | 4.8 km || 
|-id=284 bgcolor=#E9E9E9
| 42284 ||  || — || October 9, 2001 || Socorro || LINEAR || — || align=right | 7.4 km || 
|-id=285 bgcolor=#fefefe
| 42285 ||  || — || October 14, 2001 || Socorro || LINEAR || FLO || align=right | 2.1 km || 
|-id=286 bgcolor=#FFC2E0
| 42286 ||  || — || October 14, 2001 || Socorro || LINEAR || APO +1km || align=right | 1.7 km || 
|-id=287 bgcolor=#fefefe
| 42287 ||  || — || October 13, 2001 || Socorro || LINEAR || — || align=right | 3.7 km || 
|-id=288 bgcolor=#E9E9E9
| 42288 ||  || — || October 13, 2001 || Socorro || LINEAR || — || align=right | 2.5 km || 
|-id=289 bgcolor=#fefefe
| 42289 ||  || — || October 13, 2001 || Socorro || LINEAR || — || align=right | 4.0 km || 
|-id=290 bgcolor=#E9E9E9
| 42290 ||  || — || October 14, 2001 || Socorro || LINEAR || PAD || align=right | 7.4 km || 
|-id=291 bgcolor=#E9E9E9
| 42291 ||  || — || October 15, 2001 || Socorro || LINEAR || — || align=right | 9.1 km || 
|-id=292 bgcolor=#d6d6d6
| 42292 ||  || — || October 10, 2001 || Palomar || NEAT || ANF || align=right | 3.4 km || 
|-id=293 bgcolor=#E9E9E9
| 42293 ||  || — || October 17, 2001 || Desert Eagle || W. K. Y. Yeung || — || align=right | 3.1 km || 
|-id=294 bgcolor=#fefefe
| 42294 ||  || — || October 21, 2001 || Desert Eagle || W. K. Y. Yeung || FLO || align=right | 1.6 km || 
|-id=295 bgcolor=#fefefe
| 42295 Teresateng ||  ||  || October 23, 2001 || Desert Eagle || W. K. Y. Yeung || FLO || align=right | 2.2 km || 
|-id=296 bgcolor=#E9E9E9
| 42296 ||  || — || October 16, 2001 || Socorro || LINEAR || — || align=right | 4.3 km || 
|-id=297 bgcolor=#d6d6d6
| 42297 ||  || — || October 17, 2001 || Socorro || LINEAR || — || align=right | 6.7 km || 
|-id=298 bgcolor=#fefefe
| 42298 ||  || — || October 22, 2001 || Palomar || NEAT || PHO || align=right | 2.6 km || 
|-id=299 bgcolor=#d6d6d6
| 42299 ||  || — || October 22, 2001 || Socorro || LINEAR || ITH || align=right | 6.8 km || 
|-id=300 bgcolor=#d6d6d6
| 42300 ||  || — || October 23, 2001 || Socorro || LINEAR || — || align=right | 6.0 km || 
|}

42301–42400 

|-bgcolor=#C2E0FF
| 42301 ||  || — || October 21, 2001 || Kitt Peak || DES || res4:9 || align=right | 637 km || 
|-id=302 bgcolor=#E9E9E9
| 42302 ||  || — || November 10, 2001 || Socorro || LINEAR || GER || align=right | 4.5 km || 
|-id=303 bgcolor=#fefefe
| 42303 ||  || — || November 9, 2001 || Socorro || LINEAR || — || align=right | 1.4 km || 
|-id=304 bgcolor=#d6d6d6
| 42304 ||  || — || November 9, 2001 || Socorro || LINEAR || ALA || align=right | 7.6 km || 
|-id=305 bgcolor=#fefefe
| 42305 ||  || — || November 9, 2001 || Socorro || LINEAR || NYS || align=right | 2.3 km || 
|-id=306 bgcolor=#E9E9E9
| 42306 ||  || — || November 9, 2001 || Socorro || LINEAR || — || align=right | 6.5 km || 
|-id=307 bgcolor=#fefefe
| 42307 ||  || — || November 9, 2001 || Socorro || LINEAR || NYS || align=right | 2.7 km || 
|-id=308 bgcolor=#d6d6d6
| 42308 ||  || — || November 10, 2001 || Socorro || LINEAR || — || align=right | 7.4 km || 
|-id=309 bgcolor=#fefefe
| 42309 ||  || — || November 12, 2001 || Socorro || LINEAR || NYS || align=right | 3.0 km || 
|-id=310 bgcolor=#E9E9E9
| 42310 ||  || — || November 12, 2001 || Haleakala || NEAT || — || align=right | 4.9 km || 
|-id=311 bgcolor=#fefefe
| 42311 ||  || — || November 15, 2001 || Socorro || LINEAR || — || align=right | 3.1 km || 
|-id=312 bgcolor=#E9E9E9
| 42312 ||  || — || November 15, 2001 || Socorro || LINEAR || — || align=right | 3.7 km || 
|-id=313 bgcolor=#d6d6d6
| 42313 ||  || — || November 15, 2001 || Socorro || LINEAR || ULA7:4 || align=right | 11 km || 
|-id=314 bgcolor=#d6d6d6
| 42314 ||  || — || November 15, 2001 || Palomar || NEAT || TEL || align=right | 4.5 km || 
|-id=315 bgcolor=#d6d6d6
| 42315 ||  || — || November 13, 2001 || Haleakala || NEAT || EOS || align=right | 5.5 km || 
|-id=316 bgcolor=#fefefe
| 42316 ||  || — || November 17, 2001 || Socorro || LINEAR || — || align=right | 1.4 km || 
|-id=317 bgcolor=#fefefe
| 42317 ||  || — || November 17, 2001 || Socorro || LINEAR || — || align=right | 1.7 km || 
|-id=318 bgcolor=#d6d6d6
| 42318 ||  || — || December 6, 2001 || Socorro || LINEAR || EUP || align=right | 11 km || 
|-id=319 bgcolor=#fefefe
| 42319 ||  || — || December 10, 2001 || Socorro || LINEAR || NYS || align=right | 1.9 km || 
|-id=320 bgcolor=#fefefe
| 42320 ||  || — || December 9, 2001 || Socorro || LINEAR || — || align=right | 6.4 km || 
|-id=321 bgcolor=#E9E9E9
| 42321 ||  || — || December 10, 2001 || Socorro || LINEAR || — || align=right | 3.9 km || 
|-id=322 bgcolor=#fefefe
| 42322 ||  || — || December 10, 2001 || Socorro || LINEAR || — || align=right | 2.4 km || 
|-id=323 bgcolor=#d6d6d6
| 42323 ||  || — || December 10, 2001 || Socorro || LINEAR || THM || align=right | 4.5 km || 
|-id=324 bgcolor=#fefefe
| 42324 ||  || — || December 10, 2001 || Socorro || LINEAR || — || align=right | 3.3 km || 
|-id=325 bgcolor=#fefefe
| 42325 ||  || — || December 10, 2001 || Socorro || LINEAR || — || align=right | 1.9 km || 
|-id=326 bgcolor=#fefefe
| 42326 ||  || — || December 14, 2001 || Kitt Peak || Spacewatch || V || align=right | 1.8 km || 
|-id=327 bgcolor=#d6d6d6
| 42327 ||  || — || December 10, 2001 || Socorro || LINEAR || EOS || align=right | 4.4 km || 
|-id=328 bgcolor=#fefefe
| 42328 ||  || — || December 14, 2001 || Socorro || LINEAR || — || align=right | 2.9 km || 
|-id=329 bgcolor=#fefefe
| 42329 ||  || — || December 14, 2001 || Socorro || LINEAR || — || align=right | 3.5 km || 
|-id=330 bgcolor=#fefefe
| 42330 ||  || — || December 14, 2001 || Socorro || LINEAR || NYS || align=right | 1.9 km || 
|-id=331 bgcolor=#E9E9E9
| 42331 ||  || — || December 14, 2001 || Socorro || LINEAR || — || align=right | 2.0 km || 
|-id=332 bgcolor=#fefefe
| 42332 ||  || — || December 11, 2001 || Socorro || LINEAR || FLO || align=right | 1.7 km || 
|-id=333 bgcolor=#E9E9E9
| 42333 ||  || — || December 11, 2001 || Socorro || LINEAR || DOR || align=right | 9.6 km || 
|-id=334 bgcolor=#fefefe
| 42334 ||  || — || December 15, 2001 || Socorro || LINEAR || — || align=right | 1.4 km || 
|-id=335 bgcolor=#fefefe
| 42335 ||  || — || December 15, 2001 || Socorro || LINEAR || — || align=right | 1.9 km || 
|-id=336 bgcolor=#E9E9E9
| 42336 ||  || — || December 15, 2001 || Socorro || LINEAR || AGN || align=right | 3.1 km || 
|-id=337 bgcolor=#E9E9E9
| 42337 ||  || — || December 17, 2001 || Socorro || LINEAR || — || align=right | 3.0 km || 
|-id=338 bgcolor=#d6d6d6
| 42338 ||  || — || December 18, 2001 || Socorro || LINEAR || — || align=right | 3.2 km || 
|-id=339 bgcolor=#E9E9E9
| 42339 ||  || — || January 5, 2002 || Haleakala || NEAT || — || align=right | 6.9 km || 
|-id=340 bgcolor=#E9E9E9
| 42340 ||  || — || January 5, 2002 || Haleakala || NEAT || — || align=right | 4.5 km || 
|-id=341 bgcolor=#fefefe
| 42341 ||  || — || January 12, 2002 || Kitt Peak || Spacewatch || FLO || align=right | 2.1 km || 
|-id=342 bgcolor=#E9E9E9
| 42342 ||  || — || January 9, 2002 || Socorro || LINEAR || MAR || align=right | 3.6 km || 
|-id=343 bgcolor=#d6d6d6
| 42343 ||  || — || January 11, 2002 || Socorro || LINEAR || — || align=right | 5.9 km || 
|-id=344 bgcolor=#fefefe
| 42344 ||  || — || January 12, 2002 || Socorro || LINEAR || PHO || align=right | 2.9 km || 
|-id=345 bgcolor=#fefefe
| 42345 ||  || — || January 9, 2002 || Socorro || LINEAR || FLO || align=right | 1.9 km || 
|-id=346 bgcolor=#fefefe
| 42346 ||  || — || January 8, 2002 || Socorro || LINEAR || V || align=right | 2.5 km || 
|-id=347 bgcolor=#fefefe
| 42347 ||  || — || January 14, 2002 || Socorro || LINEAR || KLI || align=right | 5.8 km || 
|-id=348 bgcolor=#d6d6d6
| 42348 ||  || — || January 18, 2002 || Socorro || LINEAR || — || align=right | 12 km || 
|-id=349 bgcolor=#d6d6d6
| 42349 ||  || — || January 20, 2002 || Kitt Peak || Spacewatch || 7:4 || align=right | 6.6 km || 
|-id=350 bgcolor=#fefefe
| 42350 ||  || — || January 21, 2002 || Palomar || NEAT || — || align=right | 3.0 km || 
|-id=351 bgcolor=#fefefe
| 42351 ||  || — || February 4, 2002 || Haleakala || NEAT || MAS || align=right | 2.5 km || 
|-id=352 bgcolor=#E9E9E9
| 42352 ||  || — || February 6, 2002 || Socorro || LINEAR || GEF || align=right | 3.4 km || 
|-id=353 bgcolor=#E9E9E9
| 42353 ||  || — || February 7, 2002 || Haleakala || NEAT || EUN || align=right | 2.9 km || 
|-id=354 bgcolor=#E9E9E9
| 42354 Kindleberger ||  ||  || February 12, 2002 || Fountain Hills || C. W. Juels, P. R. Holvorcem || — || align=right | 2.9 km || 
|-id=355 bgcolor=#C2E0FF
| 42355 Typhon ||  ||  || February 5, 2002 || Palomar || NEAT || centaurmoon || align=right | 192 km || 
|-id=356 bgcolor=#fefefe
| 42356 ||  || — || February 2, 2002 || Haleakala || NEAT || — || align=right | 1.7 km || 
|-id=357 bgcolor=#E9E9E9
| 42357 ||  || — || February 12, 2002 || Fountain Hills || C. W. Juels || RAF || align=right | 2.4 km || 
|-id=358 bgcolor=#fefefe
| 42358 ||  || — || February 7, 2002 || Socorro || LINEAR || — || align=right | 3.7 km || 
|-id=359 bgcolor=#d6d6d6
| 42359 ||  || — || February 6, 2002 || Socorro || LINEAR || — || align=right | 5.4 km || 
|-id=360 bgcolor=#d6d6d6
| 42360 ||  || — || February 7, 2002 || Socorro || LINEAR || KOR || align=right | 3.9 km || 
|-id=361 bgcolor=#fefefe
| 42361 ||  || — || February 7, 2002 || Socorro || LINEAR || — || align=right | 1.9 km || 
|-id=362 bgcolor=#E9E9E9
| 42362 ||  || — || February 7, 2002 || Socorro || LINEAR || — || align=right | 3.1 km || 
|-id=363 bgcolor=#fefefe
| 42363 ||  || — || February 7, 2002 || Socorro || LINEAR || NYS || align=right | 1.8 km || 
|-id=364 bgcolor=#fefefe
| 42364 ||  || — || February 7, 2002 || Socorro || LINEAR || FLO || align=right | 2.0 km || 
|-id=365 bgcolor=#E9E9E9
| 42365 Caligiuri ||  ||  || February 12, 2002 || Fountain Hills || C. W. Juels, P. R. Holvorcem || — || align=right | 4.5 km || 
|-id=366 bgcolor=#fefefe
| 42366 ||  || — || February 7, 2002 || Socorro || LINEAR || — || align=right | 2.2 km || 
|-id=367 bgcolor=#C2FFFF
| 42367 ||  || — || February 7, 2002 || Socorro || LINEAR || L4 || align=right | 32 km || 
|-id=368 bgcolor=#d6d6d6
| 42368 ||  || — || February 8, 2002 || Socorro || LINEAR || URS || align=right | 10 km || 
|-id=369 bgcolor=#fefefe
| 42369 ||  || — || February 8, 2002 || Socorro || LINEAR || — || align=right | 10 km || 
|-id=370 bgcolor=#E9E9E9
| 42370 ||  || — || February 8, 2002 || Socorro || LINEAR || ADE || align=right | 5.7 km || 
|-id=371 bgcolor=#d6d6d6
| 42371 ||  || — || February 8, 2002 || Socorro || LINEAR || TEL || align=right | 4.2 km || 
|-id=372 bgcolor=#d6d6d6
| 42372 ||  || — || February 9, 2002 || Socorro || LINEAR || — || align=right | 6.6 km || 
|-id=373 bgcolor=#E9E9E9
| 42373 ||  || — || February 8, 2002 || Socorro || LINEAR || — || align=right | 2.4 km || 
|-id=374 bgcolor=#E9E9E9
| 42374 ||  || — || February 8, 2002 || Socorro || LINEAR || EUN || align=right | 5.3 km || 
|-id=375 bgcolor=#d6d6d6
| 42375 ||  || — || February 11, 2002 || Socorro || LINEAR || — || align=right | 4.7 km || 
|-id=376 bgcolor=#fefefe
| 42376 ||  || — || February 19, 2002 || Socorro || LINEAR || PHO || align=right | 3.2 km || 
|-id=377 bgcolor=#fefefe
| 42377 KLENOT ||  ||  || March 8, 2002 || Kleť || KLENOT || — || align=right | 2.3 km || 
|-id=378 bgcolor=#fefefe
| 42378 ||  || — || March 14, 2002 || Desert Eagle || W. K. Y. Yeung || — || align=right | 1.8 km || 
|-id=379 bgcolor=#fefefe
| 42379 || 2013 P-L || — || September 24, 1960 || Palomar || PLS || — || align=right | 2.2 km || 
|-id=380 bgcolor=#d6d6d6
| 42380 || 2065 P-L || — || September 24, 1960 || Palomar || PLS || HYG || align=right | 6.5 km || 
|-id=381 bgcolor=#d6d6d6
| 42381 || 2090 P-L || — || September 24, 1960 || Palomar || PLS || CHA || align=right | 4.8 km || 
|-id=382 bgcolor=#fefefe
| 42382 || 2183 P-L || — || September 24, 1960 || Palomar || PLS || — || align=right | 1.6 km || 
|-id=383 bgcolor=#E9E9E9
| 42383 || 2231 P-L || — || September 24, 1960 || Palomar || PLS || — || align=right | 3.7 km || 
|-id=384 bgcolor=#E9E9E9
| 42384 || 2506 P-L || — || September 24, 1960 || Palomar || PLS || ADE || align=right | 4.8 km || 
|-id=385 bgcolor=#d6d6d6
| 42385 || 2844 P-L || — || September 24, 1960 || Palomar || PLS || KOR || align=right | 2.6 km || 
|-id=386 bgcolor=#d6d6d6
| 42386 || 3552 P-L || — || October 22, 1960 || Palomar || PLS || — || align=right | 8.2 km || 
|-id=387 bgcolor=#fefefe
| 42387 || 4071 P-L || — || September 24, 1960 || Palomar || PLS || — || align=right | 2.7 km || 
|-id=388 bgcolor=#E9E9E9
| 42388 || 4111 P-L || — || September 24, 1960 || Palomar || PLS || — || align=right | 4.5 km || 
|-id=389 bgcolor=#fefefe
| 42389 || 4251 P-L || — || September 24, 1960 || Palomar || PLS || — || align=right | 1.9 km || 
|-id=390 bgcolor=#d6d6d6
| 42390 || 4305 P-L || — || September 24, 1960 || Palomar || PLS || — || align=right | 6.6 km || 
|-id=391 bgcolor=#fefefe
| 42391 || 4753 P-L || — || September 24, 1960 || Palomar || PLS || — || align=right | 1.6 km || 
|-id=392 bgcolor=#d6d6d6
| 42392 || 4908 P-L || — || September 24, 1960 || Palomar || PLS || 628 || align=right | 3.6 km || 
|-id=393 bgcolor=#d6d6d6
| 42393 || 6012 P-L || — || September 24, 1960 || Palomar || PLS || HYG || align=right | 5.9 km || 
|-id=394 bgcolor=#d6d6d6
| 42394 || 6111 P-L || — || September 24, 1960 || Palomar || PLS || — || align=right | 7.6 km || 
|-id=395 bgcolor=#E9E9E9
| 42395 || 6193 P-L || — || September 24, 1960 || Palomar || PLS || — || align=right | 4.5 km || 
|-id=396 bgcolor=#fefefe
| 42396 || 6213 P-L || — || September 24, 1960 || Palomar || PLS || — || align=right | 1.8 km || 
|-id=397 bgcolor=#d6d6d6
| 42397 || 6326 P-L || — || September 24, 1960 || Palomar || PLS || — || align=right | 4.5 km || 
|-id=398 bgcolor=#E9E9E9
| 42398 || 6370 P-L || — || September 24, 1960 || Palomar || PLS || — || align=right | 3.1 km || 
|-id=399 bgcolor=#E9E9E9
| 42399 || 6372 P-L || — || September 24, 1960 || Palomar || PLS || — || align=right | 3.0 km || 
|-id=400 bgcolor=#d6d6d6
| 42400 || 6587 P-L || — || September 24, 1960 || Palomar || PLS || THM || align=right | 5.1 km || 
|}

42401–42500 

|-bgcolor=#d6d6d6
| 42401 || 6589 P-L || — || September 24, 1960 || Palomar || PLS || — || align=right | 8.4 km || 
|-id=402 bgcolor=#fefefe
| 42402 || 6619 P-L || — || September 24, 1960 || Palomar || PLS || — || align=right | 2.0 km || 
|-id=403 bgcolor=#C2FFFF
| 42403 Andraimon || 6844 P-L ||  || September 24, 1960 || Palomar || PLS || L4 || align=right | 17 km || 
|-id=404 bgcolor=#fefefe
| 42404 || 7606 P-L || — || October 17, 1960 || Palomar || PLS || — || align=right | 1.7 km || 
|-id=405 bgcolor=#fefefe
| 42405 || 9085 P-L || — || September 27, 1960 || Palomar || PLS || — || align=right | 1.7 km || 
|-id=406 bgcolor=#d6d6d6
| 42406 || 9104 P-L || — || September 24, 1960 || Palomar || PLS || — || align=right | 6.5 km || 
|-id=407 bgcolor=#E9E9E9
| 42407 || 9509 P-L || — || October 22, 1960 || Palomar || PLS || — || align=right | 3.7 km || 
|-id=408 bgcolor=#d6d6d6
| 42408 || 9555 P-L || — || October 17, 1960 || Palomar || PLS || — || align=right | 7.1 km || 
|-id=409 bgcolor=#fefefe
| 42409 || 1108 T-1 || — || March 25, 1971 || Palomar || PLS || FLO || align=right | 1.6 km || 
|-id=410 bgcolor=#fefefe
| 42410 || 3062 T-1 || — || March 26, 1971 || Palomar || PLS || — || align=right | 3.3 km || 
|-id=411 bgcolor=#fefefe
| 42411 || 3249 T-1 || — || March 26, 1971 || Palomar || PLS || SUL || align=right | 8.2 km || 
|-id=412 bgcolor=#fefefe
| 42412 || 4320 T-1 || — || March 26, 1971 || Palomar || PLS || NYS || align=right | 4.8 km || 
|-id=413 bgcolor=#fefefe
| 42413 || 1072 T-2 || — || September 29, 1973 || Palomar || PLS || — || align=right | 1.8 km || 
|-id=414 bgcolor=#d6d6d6
| 42414 || 1130 T-2 || — || September 29, 1973 || Palomar || PLS || — || align=right | 4.7 km || 
|-id=415 bgcolor=#fefefe
| 42415 || 1175 T-2 || — || September 29, 1973 || Palomar || PLS || MAS || align=right | 2.6 km || 
|-id=416 bgcolor=#E9E9E9
| 42416 || 1195 T-2 || — || September 29, 1973 || Palomar || PLS || — || align=right | 5.8 km || 
|-id=417 bgcolor=#fefefe
| 42417 || 1613 T-2 || — || September 24, 1973 || Palomar || PLS || — || align=right | 3.1 km || 
|-id=418 bgcolor=#fefefe
| 42418 || 2081 T-2 || — || September 29, 1973 || Palomar || PLS || NYS || align=right | 1.8 km || 
|-id=419 bgcolor=#fefefe
| 42419 || 2187 T-2 || — || September 29, 1973 || Palomar || PLS || NYS || align=right | 2.1 km || 
|-id=420 bgcolor=#fefefe
| 42420 || 2290 T-2 || — || September 29, 1973 || Palomar || PLS || NYS || align=right | 1.7 km || 
|-id=421 bgcolor=#fefefe
| 42421 || 2306 T-2 || — || September 29, 1973 || Palomar || PLS || MAS || align=right | 2.7 km || 
|-id=422 bgcolor=#E9E9E9
| 42422 || 3048 T-2 || — || September 30, 1973 || Palomar || PLS || — || align=right | 5.3 km || 
|-id=423 bgcolor=#d6d6d6
| 42423 || 3085 T-2 || — || September 30, 1973 || Palomar || PLS || EOS || align=right | 3.9 km || 
|-id=424 bgcolor=#d6d6d6
| 42424 || 3120 T-2 || — || September 30, 1973 || Palomar || PLS || — || align=right | 5.8 km || 
|-id=425 bgcolor=#E9E9E9
| 42425 || 3227 T-2 || — || September 30, 1973 || Palomar || PLS || WIT || align=right | 2.9 km || 
|-id=426 bgcolor=#fefefe
| 42426 || 4634 T-2 || — || September 30, 1973 || Palomar || PLS || V || align=right | 1.4 km || 
|-id=427 bgcolor=#fefefe
| 42427 || 5061 T-2 || — || September 25, 1973 || Palomar || PLS || — || align=right | 3.4 km || 
|-id=428 bgcolor=#fefefe
| 42428 || 5089 T-2 || — || September 25, 1973 || Palomar || PLS || — || align=right | 1.6 km || 
|-id=429 bgcolor=#E9E9E9
| 42429 || 5132 T-2 || — || September 25, 1973 || Palomar || PLS || — || align=right | 4.2 km || 
|-id=430 bgcolor=#d6d6d6
| 42430 || 5158 T-2 || — || September 25, 1973 || Palomar || PLS || — || align=right | 6.6 km || 
|-id=431 bgcolor=#fefefe
| 42431 || 1051 T-3 || — || October 17, 1977 || Palomar || PLS || CIM || align=right | 5.6 km || 
|-id=432 bgcolor=#fefefe
| 42432 || 1134 T-3 || — || October 17, 1977 || Palomar || PLS || V || align=right | 2.4 km || 
|-id=433 bgcolor=#d6d6d6
| 42433 || 1887 T-3 || — || October 17, 1977 || Palomar || PLS || EOS || align=right | 4.6 km || 
|-id=434 bgcolor=#d6d6d6
| 42434 || 2121 T-3 || — || October 16, 1977 || Palomar || PLS || — || align=right | 9.0 km || 
|-id=435 bgcolor=#E9E9E9
| 42435 || 2164 T-3 || — || October 16, 1977 || Palomar || PLS || — || align=right | 6.0 km || 
|-id=436 bgcolor=#fefefe
| 42436 || 2204 T-3 || — || October 16, 1977 || Palomar || PLS || V || align=right | 1.6 km || 
|-id=437 bgcolor=#E9E9E9
| 42437 || 2266 T-3 || — || October 16, 1977 || Palomar || PLS || — || align=right | 3.3 km || 
|-id=438 bgcolor=#fefefe
| 42438 || 2317 T-3 || — || October 16, 1977 || Palomar || PLS || NYS || align=right | 6.2 km || 
|-id=439 bgcolor=#E9E9E9
| 42439 || 2355 T-3 || — || October 16, 1977 || Palomar || PLS || — || align=right | 3.7 km || 
|-id=440 bgcolor=#d6d6d6
| 42440 || 2484 T-3 || — || October 16, 1977 || Palomar || PLS || HYG || align=right | 6.1 km || 
|-id=441 bgcolor=#d6d6d6
| 42441 || 2492 T-3 || — || October 16, 1977 || Palomar || PLS || — || align=right | 10 km || 
|-id=442 bgcolor=#d6d6d6
| 42442 || 2603 T-3 || — || October 16, 1977 || Palomar || PLS || — || align=right | 6.8 km || 
|-id=443 bgcolor=#fefefe
| 42443 || 2640 T-3 || — || October 16, 1977 || Palomar || PLS || — || align=right | 1.4 km || 
|-id=444 bgcolor=#E9E9E9
| 42444 || 3064 T-3 || — || October 16, 1977 || Palomar || PLS || — || align=right | 3.6 km || 
|-id=445 bgcolor=#d6d6d6
| 42445 || 3123 T-3 || — || October 16, 1977 || Palomar || PLS || — || align=right | 7.0 km || 
|-id=446 bgcolor=#d6d6d6
| 42446 || 3248 T-3 || — || October 16, 1977 || Palomar || PLS || THM || align=right | 7.7 km || 
|-id=447 bgcolor=#E9E9E9
| 42447 || 3265 T-3 || — || October 16, 1977 || Palomar || PLS || — || align=right | 3.2 km || 
|-id=448 bgcolor=#d6d6d6
| 42448 || 3393 T-3 || — || October 16, 1977 || Palomar || PLS || EOS || align=right | 6.6 km || 
|-id=449 bgcolor=#E9E9E9
| 42449 || 3496 T-3 || — || October 16, 1977 || Palomar || PLS || — || align=right | 7.2 km || 
|-id=450 bgcolor=#fefefe
| 42450 || 3504 T-3 || — || October 16, 1977 || Palomar || PLS || — || align=right | 1.3 km || 
|-id=451 bgcolor=#d6d6d6
| 42451 || 3727 T-3 || — || October 16, 1977 || Palomar || PLS || URS || align=right | 10 km || 
|-id=452 bgcolor=#d6d6d6
| 42452 || 3970 T-3 || — || October 16, 1977 || Palomar || PLS || — || align=right | 6.0 km || 
|-id=453 bgcolor=#d6d6d6
| 42453 || 4055 T-3 || — || October 16, 1977 || Palomar || PLS || EOS || align=right | 5.2 km || 
|-id=454 bgcolor=#E9E9E9
| 42454 || 4134 T-3 || — || October 16, 1977 || Palomar || PLS || XIZ || align=right | 4.7 km || 
|-id=455 bgcolor=#d6d6d6
| 42455 || 4293 T-3 || — || October 16, 1977 || Palomar || PLS || — || align=right | 8.3 km || 
|-id=456 bgcolor=#E9E9E9
| 42456 || 4322 T-3 || — || October 16, 1977 || Palomar || PLS || PAD || align=right | 4.5 km || 
|-id=457 bgcolor=#d6d6d6
| 42457 || 4341 T-3 || — || October 16, 1977 || Palomar || PLS || — || align=right | 6.3 km || 
|-id=458 bgcolor=#E9E9E9
| 42458 || 4359 T-3 || — || October 16, 1977 || Palomar || PLS || WIT || align=right | 2.5 km || 
|-id=459 bgcolor=#d6d6d6
| 42459 || 5036 T-3 || — || October 16, 1977 || Palomar || PLS || EOS || align=right | 5.3 km || 
|-id=460 bgcolor=#fefefe
| 42460 || 5106 T-3 || — || October 16, 1977 || Palomar || PLS || V || align=right | 1.7 km || 
|-id=461 bgcolor=#fefefe
| 42461 || 5184 T-3 || — || October 16, 1977 || Palomar || PLS || — || align=right | 2.1 km || 
|-id=462 bgcolor=#fefefe
| 42462 || 5278 T-3 || — || October 17, 1977 || Palomar || PLS || — || align=right | 2.7 km || 
|-id=463 bgcolor=#E9E9E9
| 42463 || 5601 T-3 || — || October 16, 1977 || Palomar || PLS || EUN || align=right | 2.5 km || 
|-id=464 bgcolor=#E9E9E9
| 42464 ||  || — || September 2, 1978 || La Silla || C.-I. Lagerkvist || — || align=right | 2.7 km || 
|-id=465 bgcolor=#fefefe
| 42465 ||  || — || November 7, 1978 || Palomar || E. F. Helin, S. J. Bus || NYS || align=right | 2.0 km || 
|-id=466 bgcolor=#E9E9E9
| 42466 ||  || — || November 6, 1978 || Palomar || E. F. Helin, S. J. Bus || — || align=right | 2.7 km || 
|-id=467 bgcolor=#E9E9E9
| 42467 ||  || — || November 7, 1978 || Palomar || E. F. Helin, S. J. Bus || ADE || align=right | 7.0 km || 
|-id=468 bgcolor=#fefefe
| 42468 ||  || — || August 22, 1979 || La Silla || C.-I. Lagerkvist || — || align=right | 1.8 km || 
|-id=469 bgcolor=#fefefe
| 42469 ||  || — || February 28, 1981 || Siding Spring || S. J. Bus || FLO || align=right | 1.8 km || 
|-id=470 bgcolor=#fefefe
| 42470 ||  || — || March 6, 1981 || Siding Spring || S. J. Bus || — || align=right | 2.4 km || 
|-id=471 bgcolor=#E9E9E9
| 42471 ||  || — || March 6, 1981 || Siding Spring || S. J. Bus || — || align=right | 3.9 km || 
|-id=472 bgcolor=#fefefe
| 42472 ||  || — || March 2, 1981 || Siding Spring || S. J. Bus || — || align=right | 2.0 km || 
|-id=473 bgcolor=#fefefe
| 42473 ||  || — || March 2, 1981 || Siding Spring || S. J. Bus || FLO || align=right | 1.7 km || 
|-id=474 bgcolor=#fefefe
| 42474 ||  || — || March 2, 1981 || Siding Spring || S. J. Bus || — || align=right | 1.5 km || 
|-id=475 bgcolor=#fefefe
| 42475 ||  || — || March 1, 1981 || Siding Spring || S. J. Bus || — || align=right | 1.8 km || 
|-id=476 bgcolor=#d6d6d6
| 42476 ||  || — || March 7, 1981 || Siding Spring || S. J. Bus || EOS || align=right | 4.5 km || 
|-id=477 bgcolor=#d6d6d6
| 42477 ||  || — || August 24, 1981 || La Silla || H. Debehogne || — || align=right | 6.7 km || 
|-id=478 bgcolor=#E9E9E9
| 42478 Inozemtseva ||  ||  || September 7, 1981 || Nauchnij || L. G. Karachkina || EUN || align=right | 5.0 km || 
|-id=479 bgcolor=#E9E9E9
| 42479 Tolik ||  ||  || September 28, 1981 || Nauchnij || L. V. Zhuravleva || — || align=right | 11 km || 
|-id=480 bgcolor=#E9E9E9
| 42480 || 1985 RJ || — || September 14, 1985 || Anderson Mesa || E. Bowell || — || align=right | 6.9 km || 
|-id=481 bgcolor=#E9E9E9
| 42481 ||  || — || February 13, 1988 || La Silla || E. W. Elst || — || align=right | 4.2 km || 
|-id=482 bgcolor=#fefefe
| 42482 Fischer-Dieskau ||  ||  || September 8, 1988 || Tautenburg Observatory || F. Börngen || NYS || align=right | 1.7 km || 
|-id=483 bgcolor=#fefefe
| 42483 ||  || — || November 12, 1990 || Kushiro || S. Ueda, H. Kaneda || — || align=right | 3.4 km || 
|-id=484 bgcolor=#fefefe
| 42484 ||  || — || November 21, 1990 || La Silla || E. W. Elst || — || align=right | 1.9 km || 
|-id=485 bgcolor=#fefefe
| 42485 Stendhal ||  ||  || January 18, 1991 || Haute Provence || E. W. Elst || — || align=right | 1.5 km || 
|-id=486 bgcolor=#fefefe
| 42486 ||  || — || April 8, 1991 || La Silla || E. W. Elst || — || align=right | 2.2 km || 
|-id=487 bgcolor=#fefefe
| 42487 Ångström ||  ||  || September 9, 1991 || Tautenburg Observatory || F. Börngen, L. D. Schmadel || — || align=right | 2.8 km || 
|-id=488 bgcolor=#fefefe
| 42488 ||  || — || September 11, 1991 || Palomar || H. E. Holt || — || align=right | 3.6 km || 
|-id=489 bgcolor=#E9E9E9
| 42489 ||  || — || September 13, 1991 || Palomar || H. E. Holt || EUN || align=right | 3.7 km || 
|-id=490 bgcolor=#fefefe
| 42490 || 1991 SU || — || September 30, 1991 || Siding Spring || R. H. McNaught || — || align=right | 3.9 km || 
|-id=491 bgcolor=#E9E9E9
| 42491 || 1991 TF || — || October 1, 1991 || Siding Spring || R. H. McNaught || JUN || align=right | 2.7 km || 
|-id=492 bgcolor=#fefefe
| 42492 Brüggenthies ||  ||  || October 3, 1991 || Tautenburg Observatory || L. D. Schmadel, F. Börngen || — || align=right | 2.1 km || 
|-id=493 bgcolor=#d6d6d6
| 42493 ||  || — || October 2, 1991 || Palomar || C. P. de Saint-Aignan || — || align=right | 12 km || 
|-id=494 bgcolor=#E9E9E9
| 42494 ||  || — || October 29, 1991 || Kitt Peak || Spacewatch || RAF || align=right | 3.7 km || 
|-id=495 bgcolor=#E9E9E9
| 42495 ||  || — || November 11, 1991 || Kitt Peak || Spacewatch || — || align=right | 2.5 km || 
|-id=496 bgcolor=#E9E9E9
| 42496 ||  || — || December 13, 1991 || Kiyosato || S. Otomo || JUN || align=right | 9.0 km || 
|-id=497 bgcolor=#E9E9E9
| 42497 ||  || — || January 30, 1992 || La Silla || E. W. Elst || — || align=right | 5.8 km || 
|-id=498 bgcolor=#E9E9E9
| 42498 ||  || — || February 29, 1992 || La Silla || UESAC || — || align=right | 3.3 km || 
|-id=499 bgcolor=#fefefe
| 42499 ||  || — || August 6, 1992 || Palomar || H. E. Holt || FLO || align=right | 2.6 km || 
|-id=500 bgcolor=#d6d6d6
| 42500 ||  || — || September 2, 1992 || La Silla || E. W. Elst || THMslow || align=right | 8.6 km || 
|}

42501–42600 

|-bgcolor=#FA8072
| 42501 || 1992 YC || — || December 17, 1992 || Caussols || C. Pollas || — || align=right | 3.0 km || 
|-id=502 bgcolor=#E9E9E9
| 42502 ||  || — || February 10, 1993 || Kushiro || S. Ueda, H. Kaneda || — || align=right | 3.7 km || 
|-id=503 bgcolor=#E9E9E9
| 42503 ||  || — || March 17, 1993 || La Silla || UESAC || — || align=right | 3.5 km || 
|-id=504 bgcolor=#E9E9E9
| 42504 ||  || — || March 17, 1993 || La Silla || UESAC || — || align=right | 4.4 km || 
|-id=505 bgcolor=#fefefe
| 42505 ||  || — || March 17, 1993 || La Silla || UESAC || V || align=right | 1.7 km || 
|-id=506 bgcolor=#E9E9E9
| 42506 ||  || — || March 21, 1993 || La Silla || UESAC || — || align=right | 5.2 km || 
|-id=507 bgcolor=#E9E9E9
| 42507 ||  || — || March 21, 1993 || La Silla || UESAC || — || align=right | 5.5 km || 
|-id=508 bgcolor=#E9E9E9
| 42508 ||  || — || March 21, 1993 || La Silla || UESAC || — || align=right | 2.3 km || 
|-id=509 bgcolor=#E9E9E9
| 42509 ||  || — || March 19, 1993 || La Silla || UESAC || RAF || align=right | 4.2 km || 
|-id=510 bgcolor=#E9E9E9
| 42510 ||  || — || March 17, 1993 || La Silla || UESAC || — || align=right | 2.3 km || 
|-id=511 bgcolor=#E9E9E9
| 42511 ||  || — || March 21, 1993 || La Silla || UESAC || — || align=right | 3.1 km || 
|-id=512 bgcolor=#E9E9E9
| 42512 ||  || — || March 18, 1993 || La Silla || UESAC || — || align=right | 4.1 km || 
|-id=513 bgcolor=#fefefe
| 42513 ||  || — || September 18, 1993 || Palomar || H. E. Holt || — || align=right | 2.5 km || 
|-id=514 bgcolor=#d6d6d6
| 42514 ||  || — || October 9, 1993 || La Silla || E. W. Elst || — || align=right | 6.3 km || 
|-id=515 bgcolor=#d6d6d6
| 42515 ||  || — || October 9, 1993 || La Silla || E. W. Elst || — || align=right | 6.5 km || 
|-id=516 bgcolor=#d6d6d6
| 42516 Oistrach ||  ||  || November 11, 1993 || Tautenburg Observatory || F. Börngen || — || align=right | 7.1 km || 
|-id=517 bgcolor=#fefefe
| 42517 ||  || — || December 14, 1993 || Palomar || E. F. Helin || PHO || align=right | 3.7 km || 
|-id=518 bgcolor=#fefefe
| 42518 ||  || — || January 7, 1994 || Kitt Peak || Spacewatch || FLO || align=right | 3.5 km || 
|-id=519 bgcolor=#d6d6d6
| 42519 ||  || — || January 7, 1994 || Kitt Peak || Spacewatch || THM || align=right | 6.7 km || 
|-id=520 bgcolor=#fefefe
| 42520 ||  || — || January 7, 1994 || Kitt Peak || Spacewatch || MAS || align=right | 1.4 km || 
|-id=521 bgcolor=#d6d6d6
| 42521 ||  || — || January 16, 1994 || Caussols || E. W. Elst, C. Pollas || TIR || align=right | 12 km || 
|-id=522 bgcolor=#fefefe
| 42522 Chuckberry ||  ||  || February 8, 1994 || La Silla || E. W. Elst || NYS || align=right | 1.9 km || 
|-id=523 bgcolor=#fefefe
| 42523 Ragazzileonardo || 1994 ES ||  || March 6, 1994 || San Marcello || L. Tesi, G. Cattani || PHO || align=right | 2.1 km || 
|-id=524 bgcolor=#E9E9E9
| 42524 ||  || — || August 10, 1994 || La Silla || E. W. Elst || HEN || align=right | 4.0 km || 
|-id=525 bgcolor=#E9E9E9
| 42525 ||  || — || August 12, 1994 || La Silla || E. W. Elst || HEN || align=right | 2.2 km || 
|-id=526 bgcolor=#E9E9E9
| 42526 ||  || — || August 10, 1994 || La Silla || E. W. Elst || HEN || align=right | 3.2 km || 
|-id=527 bgcolor=#E9E9E9
| 42527 ||  || — || October 2, 1994 || Kitami || K. Endate, K. Watanabe || GEF || align=right | 6.1 km || 
|-id=528 bgcolor=#E9E9E9
| 42528 ||  || — || March 25, 1995 || Kitt Peak || Spacewatch || — || align=right | 3.8 km || 
|-id=529 bgcolor=#fefefe
| 42529 ||  || — || March 28, 1995 || Kitt Peak || Spacewatch || FLO || align=right | 2.3 km || 
|-id=530 bgcolor=#fefefe
| 42530 || 1995 GA || — || April 1, 1995 || Oizumi || T. Kobayashi || — || align=right | 2.5 km || 
|-id=531 bgcolor=#FA8072
| 42531 McKenna || 1995 LJ ||  || June 5, 1995 || Siding Spring || D. J. Asher || — || align=right | 1.8 km || 
|-id=532 bgcolor=#fefefe
| 42532 || 1995 OR || — || July 24, 1995 || Nachi-Katsuura || Y. Shimizu, T. Urata || — || align=right | 2.1 km || 
|-id=533 bgcolor=#E9E9E9
| 42533 ||  || — || September 18, 1995 || Kitt Peak || Spacewatch || — || align=right | 2.6 km || 
|-id=534 bgcolor=#fefefe
| 42534 ||  || — || October 27, 1995 || Oizumi || T. Kobayashi || NYS || align=right | 2.8 km || 
|-id=535 bgcolor=#E9E9E9
| 42535 ||  || — || November 15, 1995 || Kitt Peak || Spacewatch || — || align=right | 1.9 km || 
|-id=536 bgcolor=#E9E9E9
| 42536 ||  || — || November 15, 1995 || Kitt Peak || Spacewatch || — || align=right | 2.2 km || 
|-id=537 bgcolor=#E9E9E9
| 42537 ||  || — || November 18, 1995 || Oizumi || T. Kobayashi || — || align=right | 3.7 km || 
|-id=538 bgcolor=#E9E9E9
| 42538 ||  || — || November 29, 1995 || Oizumi || T. Kobayashi || — || align=right | 5.2 km || 
|-id=539 bgcolor=#E9E9E9
| 42539 ||  || — || November 16, 1995 || Kitt Peak || Spacewatch || — || align=right | 2.4 km || 
|-id=540 bgcolor=#E9E9E9
| 42540 ||  || — || November 17, 1995 || Kitt Peak || Spacewatch || — || align=right | 1.8 km || 
|-id=541 bgcolor=#E9E9E9
| 42541 || 1996 AQ || — || January 11, 1996 || Oizumi || T. Kobayashi || — || align=right | 6.5 km || 
|-id=542 bgcolor=#d6d6d6
| 42542 || 1996 AX || — || January 11, 1996 || Oizumi || T. Kobayashi || — || align=right | 5.2 km || 
|-id=543 bgcolor=#E9E9E9
| 42543 || 1996 BR || — || January 16, 1996 || Sudbury || D. di Cicco || — || align=right | 7.5 km || 
|-id=544 bgcolor=#d6d6d6
| 42544 ||  || — || March 11, 1996 || Haleakala || AMOS || 628 || align=right | 4.9 km || 
|-id=545 bgcolor=#d6d6d6
| 42545 ||  || — || March 21, 1996 || Stroncone || A. Vagnozzi || — || align=right | 7.0 km || 
|-id=546 bgcolor=#fefefe
| 42546 ||  || — || April 15, 1996 || Višnjan Observatory || Višnjan Obs. || — || align=right | 2.9 km || 
|-id=547 bgcolor=#d6d6d6
| 42547 ||  || — || April 15, 1996 || La Silla || E. W. Elst || THM || align=right | 6.8 km || 
|-id=548 bgcolor=#fefefe
| 42548 ||  || — || April 17, 1996 || La Silla || E. W. Elst || — || align=right | 4.0 km || 
|-id=549 bgcolor=#fefefe
| 42549 ||  || — || April 18, 1996 || La Silla || E. W. Elst || — || align=right | 3.1 km || 
|-id=550 bgcolor=#fefefe
| 42550 ||  || — || April 20, 1996 || La Silla || E. W. Elst || V || align=right | 2.3 km || 
|-id=551 bgcolor=#d6d6d6
| 42551 ||  || — || May 12, 1996 || Kitt Peak || Spacewatch || — || align=right | 5.3 km || 
|-id=552 bgcolor=#fefefe
| 42552 ||  || — || September 11, 1996 || Haleakala || NEAT || ERI || align=right | 4.9 km || 
|-id=553 bgcolor=#fefefe
| 42553 ||  || — || September 12, 1996 || Kitt Peak || Spacewatch || — || align=right | 2.2 km || 
|-id=554 bgcolor=#C2FFFF
| 42554 ||  || — || September 11, 1996 || La Silla || UDTS || L4 || align=right | 27 km || 
|-id=555 bgcolor=#C2FFFF
| 42555 ||  || — || September 13, 1996 || La Silla || UDTS || L4 || align=right | 18 km || 
|-id=556 bgcolor=#fefefe
| 42556 ||  || — || October 12, 1996 || Sudbury || D. di Cicco || — || align=right | 1.9 km || 
|-id=557 bgcolor=#fefefe
| 42557 ||  || — || October 7, 1996 || Kitt Peak || Spacewatch || — || align=right | 1.9 km || 
|-id=558 bgcolor=#fefefe
| 42558 ||  || — || November 5, 1996 || Kitt Peak || Spacewatch || NYS || align=right | 2.1 km || 
|-id=559 bgcolor=#fefefe
| 42559 ||  || — || November 11, 1996 || Kitt Peak || Spacewatch || — || align=right | 1.9 km || 
|-id=560 bgcolor=#fefefe
| 42560 ||  || — || November 7, 1996 || Kushiro || S. Ueda, H. Kaneda || — || align=right | 2.4 km || 
|-id=561 bgcolor=#fefefe
| 42561 ||  || — || December 3, 1996 || Nachi-Katsuura || Y. Shimizu, T. Urata || NYS || align=right | 2.0 km || 
|-id=562 bgcolor=#fefefe
| 42562 ||  || — || December 7, 1996 || Kitt Peak || Spacewatch || — || align=right | 1.6 km || 
|-id=563 bgcolor=#fefefe
| 42563 ||  || — || December 8, 1996 || Kitt Peak || Spacewatch || NYS || align=right | 1.4 km || 
|-id=564 bgcolor=#fefefe
| 42564 ||  || — || December 12, 1996 || Kitt Peak || Spacewatch || V || align=right | 2.1 km || 
|-id=565 bgcolor=#fefefe
| 42565 ||  || — || December 5, 1996 || Kitt Peak || Spacewatch || KLI || align=right | 4.6 km || 
|-id=566 bgcolor=#fefefe
| 42566 Ryutaro ||  ||  || December 3, 1996 || Geisei || T. Seki || ERI || align=right | 2.7 km || 
|-id=567 bgcolor=#fefefe
| 42567 ||  || — || December 6, 1996 || Xinglong || SCAP || V || align=right | 3.0 km || 
|-id=568 bgcolor=#fefefe
| 42568 || 1996 YC || — || December 20, 1996 || Oizumi || T. Kobayashi || — || align=right | 3.4 km || 
|-id=569 bgcolor=#fefefe
| 42569 ||  || — || December 20, 1996 || Oizumi || T. Kobayashi || — || align=right | 2.8 km || 
|-id=570 bgcolor=#fefefe
| 42570 ||  || — || December 20, 1996 || Xinglong || SCAP || — || align=right | 4.4 km || 
|-id=571 bgcolor=#fefefe
| 42571 ||  || — || December 18, 1996 || Xinglong || SCAP || — || align=right | 4.1 km || 
|-id=572 bgcolor=#fefefe
| 42572 || 1997 AO || — || January 2, 1997 || Oizumi || T. Kobayashi || — || align=right | 3.4 km || 
|-id=573 bgcolor=#E9E9E9
| 42573 ||  || — || January 2, 1997 || Oizumi || T. Kobayashi || EUN || align=right | 4.7 km || 
|-id=574 bgcolor=#E9E9E9
| 42574 ||  || — || January 4, 1997 || Oizumi || T. Kobayashi || — || align=right | 3.1 km || 
|-id=575 bgcolor=#E9E9E9
| 42575 ||  || — || January 6, 1997 || Oizumi || T. Kobayashi || — || align=right | 2.9 km || 
|-id=576 bgcolor=#E9E9E9
| 42576 ||  || — || January 7, 1997 || Oizumi || T. Kobayashi || — || align=right | 2.9 km || 
|-id=577 bgcolor=#fefefe
| 42577 ||  || — || January 15, 1997 || Oizumi || T. Kobayashi || V || align=right | 2.9 km || 
|-id=578 bgcolor=#fefefe
| 42578 ||  || — || January 31, 1997 || Kitt Peak || Spacewatch || NYS || align=right | 1.7 km || 
|-id=579 bgcolor=#E9E9E9
| 42579 ||  || — || January 31, 1997 || Prescott || P. G. Comba || — || align=right | 2.8 km || 
|-id=580 bgcolor=#E9E9E9
| 42580 ||  || — || February 3, 1997 || Kitt Peak || Spacewatch || — || align=right | 2.4 km || 
|-id=581 bgcolor=#E9E9E9
| 42581 ||  || — || February 7, 1997 || Xinglong || SCAP || — || align=right | 3.1 km || 
|-id=582 bgcolor=#E9E9E9
| 42582 ||  || — || March 2, 1997 || Kitt Peak || Spacewatch || — || align=right | 4.1 km || 
|-id=583 bgcolor=#E9E9E9
| 42583 ||  || — || March 4, 1997 || Socorro || LINEAR || — || align=right | 6.0 km || 
|-id=584 bgcolor=#d6d6d6
| 42584 ||  || — || March 12, 1997 || La Silla || E. W. Elst || — || align=right | 7.1 km || 
|-id=585 bgcolor=#E9E9E9
| 42585 Pheidippides ||  ||  || March 30, 1997 || Colleverde || V. S. Casulli || — || align=right | 3.1 km || 
|-id=586 bgcolor=#E9E9E9
| 42586 ||  || — || March 31, 1997 || Socorro || LINEAR || — || align=right | 4.1 km || 
|-id=587 bgcolor=#E9E9E9
| 42587 ||  || — || April 2, 1997 || Socorro || LINEAR || — || align=right | 5.5 km || 
|-id=588 bgcolor=#fefefe
| 42588 ||  || — || April 3, 1997 || Socorro || LINEAR || — || align=right | 1.4 km || 
|-id=589 bgcolor=#E9E9E9
| 42589 ||  || — || April 3, 1997 || Socorro || LINEAR || — || align=right | 3.1 km || 
|-id=590 bgcolor=#E9E9E9
| 42590 ||  || — || April 3, 1997 || Socorro || LINEAR || — || align=right | 3.3 km || 
|-id=591 bgcolor=#E9E9E9
| 42591 ||  || — || April 9, 1997 || La Silla || E. W. Elst || — || align=right | 3.3 km || 
|-id=592 bgcolor=#E9E9E9
| 42592 || 1997 HT || — || April 28, 1997 || Kitt Peak || Spacewatch || — || align=right | 5.8 km || 
|-id=593 bgcolor=#E9E9E9
| 42593 Antoniazzi || 1997 JQ ||  || May 1, 1997 || Bologna || San Vittore Obs. || — || align=right | 3.1 km || 
|-id=594 bgcolor=#E9E9E9
| 42594 ||  || — || May 1, 1997 || Caussols || ODAS || — || align=right | 6.1 km || 
|-id=595 bgcolor=#fefefe
| 42595 || 1997 PL || — || August 1, 1997 || Haleakala || NEAT || — || align=right | 2.7 km || 
|-id=596 bgcolor=#fefefe
| 42596 || 1997 SB || — || September 18, 1997 || Modra || P. Zigo, A. Pravda || H || align=right | 1.4 km || 
|-id=597 bgcolor=#fefefe
| 42597 ||  || — || September 23, 1997 || Kitt Peak || Spacewatch || — || align=right | 2.1 km || 
|-id=598 bgcolor=#fefefe
| 42598 ||  || — || October 29, 1997 || Kleť || Kleť Obs. || — || align=right | 5.3 km || 
|-id=599 bgcolor=#d6d6d6
| 42599 ||  || — || October 25, 1997 || Nyukasa || M. Hirasawa, S. Suzuki || — || align=right | 12 km || 
|-id=600 bgcolor=#fefefe
| 42600 ||  || — || December 28, 1997 || Oizumi || T. Kobayashi || — || align=right | 4.3 km || 
|}

42601–42700 

|-bgcolor=#fefefe
| 42601 ||  || — || January 2, 1998 || Reedy Creek || J. Broughton || FLO || align=right | 2.2 km || 
|-id=602 bgcolor=#fefefe
| 42602 ||  || — || January 24, 1998 || Oizumi || T. Kobayashi || FLO || align=right | 4.3 km || 
|-id=603 bgcolor=#fefefe
| 42603 ||  || — || January 23, 1998 || Socorro || LINEAR || FLO || align=right | 2.5 km || 
|-id=604 bgcolor=#fefefe
| 42604 ||  || — || January 24, 1998 || Haleakala || NEAT || FLO || align=right | 3.9 km || 
|-id=605 bgcolor=#fefefe
| 42605 ||  || — || January 27, 1998 || Kleť || Kleť Obs. || — || align=right | 1.4 km || 
|-id=606 bgcolor=#fefefe
| 42606 || 1998 DD || — || February 16, 1998 || Xinglong || SCAP || — || align=right | 2.9 km || 
|-id=607 bgcolor=#fefefe
| 42607 ||  || — || February 23, 1998 || Haleakala || NEAT || — || align=right | 3.5 km || 
|-id=608 bgcolor=#fefefe
| 42608 ||  || — || February 28, 1998 || Oaxaca || J. M. Roe || — || align=right | 2.7 km || 
|-id=609 bgcolor=#FA8072
| 42609 Daubechies ||  ||  || February 27, 1998 || La Silla || E. W. Elst || — || align=right | 3.0 km || 
|-id=610 bgcolor=#fefefe
| 42610 ||  || — || February 27, 1998 || La Silla || E. W. Elst || NYS || align=right | 1.8 km || 
|-id=611 bgcolor=#fefefe
| 42611 Manchu ||  ||  || March 2, 1998 || Caussols || ODAS || NYS || align=right | 1.4 km || 
|-id=612 bgcolor=#fefefe
| 42612 ||  || — || March 1, 1998 || Kitt Peak || Spacewatch || — || align=right | 2.4 km || 
|-id=613 bgcolor=#fefefe
| 42613 ||  || — || March 2, 1998 || Kitt Peak || Spacewatch || — || align=right | 1.9 km || 
|-id=614 bgcolor=#fefefe
| 42614 Ubaldina ||  ||  || March 2, 1998 || San Marcello || L. Tesi, A. Caronia || — || align=right | 2.2 km || 
|-id=615 bgcolor=#fefefe
| 42615 ||  || — || March 1, 1998 || La Silla || E. W. Elst || V || align=right | 1.8 km || 
|-id=616 bgcolor=#fefefe
| 42616 ||  || — || March 3, 1998 || La Silla || E. W. Elst || NYS || align=right | 2.0 km || 
|-id=617 bgcolor=#fefefe
| 42617 ||  || — || March 20, 1998 || Woomera || F. B. Zoltowski || V || align=right | 1.7 km || 
|-id=618 bgcolor=#fefefe
| 42618 ||  || — || March 21, 1998 || Kitt Peak || Spacewatch || FLO || align=right | 2.4 km || 
|-id=619 bgcolor=#fefefe
| 42619 ||  || — || March 25, 1998 || Kleť || Kleť Obs. || — || align=right | 3.8 km || 
|-id=620 bgcolor=#fefefe
| 42620 ||  || — || March 26, 1998 || Haleakala || NEAT || FLO || align=right | 2.9 km || 
|-id=621 bgcolor=#fefefe
| 42621 ||  || — || March 20, 1998 || Socorro || LINEAR || — || align=right | 3.4 km || 
|-id=622 bgcolor=#fefefe
| 42622 ||  || — || March 20, 1998 || Socorro || LINEAR || EUT || align=right | 2.1 km || 
|-id=623 bgcolor=#fefefe
| 42623 ||  || — || March 20, 1998 || Socorro || LINEAR || — || align=right | 2.1 km || 
|-id=624 bgcolor=#fefefe
| 42624 ||  || — || March 20, 1998 || Socorro || LINEAR || FLO || align=right | 1.9 km || 
|-id=625 bgcolor=#fefefe
| 42625 ||  || — || March 20, 1998 || Socorro || LINEAR || FLO || align=right | 2.3 km || 
|-id=626 bgcolor=#fefefe
| 42626 ||  || — || March 20, 1998 || Socorro || LINEAR || MAS || align=right | 1.8 km || 
|-id=627 bgcolor=#fefefe
| 42627 ||  || — || March 20, 1998 || Socorro || LINEAR || — || align=right | 2.7 km || 
|-id=628 bgcolor=#fefefe
| 42628 ||  || — || March 20, 1998 || Socorro || LINEAR || NYS || align=right | 2.1 km || 
|-id=629 bgcolor=#fefefe
| 42629 ||  || — || March 20, 1998 || Socorro || LINEAR || — || align=right | 2.7 km || 
|-id=630 bgcolor=#fefefe
| 42630 ||  || — || March 20, 1998 || Socorro || LINEAR || — || align=right | 2.5 km || 
|-id=631 bgcolor=#fefefe
| 42631 ||  || — || March 20, 1998 || Socorro || LINEAR || — || align=right | 2.3 km || 
|-id=632 bgcolor=#fefefe
| 42632 ||  || — || March 20, 1998 || Socorro || LINEAR || — || align=right | 2.2 km || 
|-id=633 bgcolor=#fefefe
| 42633 ||  || — || March 20, 1998 || Socorro || LINEAR || — || align=right | 3.2 km || 
|-id=634 bgcolor=#fefefe
| 42634 ||  || — || March 20, 1998 || Socorro || LINEAR || NYS || align=right | 1.8 km || 
|-id=635 bgcolor=#fefefe
| 42635 ||  || — || March 20, 1998 || Socorro || LINEAR || MAS || align=right | 2.0 km || 
|-id=636 bgcolor=#fefefe
| 42636 ||  || — || March 20, 1998 || Socorro || LINEAR || — || align=right | 2.5 km || 
|-id=637 bgcolor=#fefefe
| 42637 ||  || — || March 20, 1998 || Socorro || LINEAR || — || align=right | 5.4 km || 
|-id=638 bgcolor=#fefefe
| 42638 ||  || — || March 20, 1998 || Socorro || LINEAR || — || align=right | 4.6 km || 
|-id=639 bgcolor=#fefefe
| 42639 ||  || — || March 20, 1998 || Socorro || LINEAR || NYS || align=right | 2.0 km || 
|-id=640 bgcolor=#fefefe
| 42640 ||  || — || March 20, 1998 || Socorro || LINEAR || NYS || align=right | 1.9 km || 
|-id=641 bgcolor=#fefefe
| 42641 ||  || — || March 20, 1998 || Socorro || LINEAR || FLO || align=right | 1.8 km || 
|-id=642 bgcolor=#fefefe
| 42642 ||  || — || March 20, 1998 || Socorro || LINEAR || — || align=right | 2.7 km || 
|-id=643 bgcolor=#fefefe
| 42643 ||  || — || March 20, 1998 || Socorro || LINEAR || MAS || align=right | 2.0 km || 
|-id=644 bgcolor=#fefefe
| 42644 ||  || — || March 20, 1998 || Socorro || LINEAR || V || align=right | 3.9 km || 
|-id=645 bgcolor=#fefefe
| 42645 ||  || — || March 20, 1998 || Socorro || LINEAR || — || align=right | 5.6 km || 
|-id=646 bgcolor=#fefefe
| 42646 ||  || — || March 20, 1998 || Socorro || LINEAR || MAS || align=right | 2.1 km || 
|-id=647 bgcolor=#fefefe
| 42647 ||  || — || March 20, 1998 || Socorro || LINEAR || — || align=right | 2.3 km || 
|-id=648 bgcolor=#fefefe
| 42648 ||  || — || March 20, 1998 || Socorro || LINEAR || NYS || align=right | 2.1 km || 
|-id=649 bgcolor=#fefefe
| 42649 ||  || — || March 24, 1998 || Socorro || LINEAR || — || align=right | 2.7 km || 
|-id=650 bgcolor=#fefefe
| 42650 ||  || — || March 24, 1998 || Socorro || LINEAR || NYS || align=right | 1.8 km || 
|-id=651 bgcolor=#fefefe
| 42651 ||  || — || March 24, 1998 || Socorro || LINEAR || — || align=right | 2.4 km || 
|-id=652 bgcolor=#fefefe
| 42652 ||  || — || March 24, 1998 || Socorro || LINEAR || FLO || align=right | 2.3 km || 
|-id=653 bgcolor=#fefefe
| 42653 ||  || — || March 24, 1998 || Socorro || LINEAR || V || align=right | 2.1 km || 
|-id=654 bgcolor=#fefefe
| 42654 ||  || — || March 31, 1998 || Socorro || LINEAR || — || align=right | 4.4 km || 
|-id=655 bgcolor=#fefefe
| 42655 ||  || — || March 31, 1998 || Socorro || LINEAR || V || align=right | 2.8 km || 
|-id=656 bgcolor=#fefefe
| 42656 ||  || — || March 31, 1998 || Socorro || LINEAR || — || align=right | 2.3 km || 
|-id=657 bgcolor=#fefefe
| 42657 ||  || — || March 31, 1998 || Socorro || LINEAR || V || align=right | 2.4 km || 
|-id=658 bgcolor=#fefefe
| 42658 ||  || — || March 31, 1998 || Socorro || LINEAR || V || align=right | 1.5 km || 
|-id=659 bgcolor=#fefefe
| 42659 ||  || — || March 20, 1998 || Socorro || LINEAR || — || align=right | 2.3 km || 
|-id=660 bgcolor=#fefefe
| 42660 ||  || — || March 29, 1998 || Višnjan Observatory || Višnjan Obs. || V || align=right | 1.9 km || 
|-id=661 bgcolor=#E9E9E9
| 42661 ||  || — || March 29, 1998 || Višnjan Observatory || Višnjan Obs. || ADE || align=right | 6.1 km || 
|-id=662 bgcolor=#fefefe
| 42662 ||  || — || March 20, 1998 || Socorro || LINEAR || FLO || align=right | 2.2 km || 
|-id=663 bgcolor=#fefefe
| 42663 ||  || — || March 20, 1998 || Socorro || LINEAR || NYS || align=right | 3.2 km || 
|-id=664 bgcolor=#E9E9E9
| 42664 ||  || — || March 29, 1998 || Socorro || LINEAR || — || align=right | 3.7 km || 
|-id=665 bgcolor=#fefefe
| 42665 ||  || — || April 19, 1998 || Kitt Peak || Spacewatch || V || align=right | 1.8 km || 
|-id=666 bgcolor=#fefefe
| 42666 ||  || — || April 22, 1998 || Caussols || ODAS || — || align=right | 2.8 km || 
|-id=667 bgcolor=#fefefe
| 42667 ||  || — || April 20, 1998 || Socorro || LINEAR || — || align=right | 2.2 km || 
|-id=668 bgcolor=#fefefe
| 42668 ||  || — || April 20, 1998 || Socorro || LINEAR || — || align=right | 2.9 km || 
|-id=669 bgcolor=#fefefe
| 42669 ||  || — || April 20, 1998 || Socorro || LINEAR || — || align=right | 2.4 km || 
|-id=670 bgcolor=#fefefe
| 42670 ||  || — || April 20, 1998 || Socorro || LINEAR || — || align=right | 3.3 km || 
|-id=671 bgcolor=#fefefe
| 42671 ||  || — || April 21, 1998 || Socorro || LINEAR || V || align=right | 2.7 km || 
|-id=672 bgcolor=#fefefe
| 42672 ||  || — || April 21, 1998 || Socorro || LINEAR || V || align=right | 2.7 km || 
|-id=673 bgcolor=#E9E9E9
| 42673 ||  || — || April 21, 1998 || Socorro || LINEAR || — || align=right | 2.1 km || 
|-id=674 bgcolor=#fefefe
| 42674 ||  || — || April 21, 1998 || Socorro || LINEAR || NYS || align=right | 3.7 km || 
|-id=675 bgcolor=#fefefe
| 42675 ||  || — || April 23, 1998 || Socorro || LINEAR || V || align=right | 2.8 km || 
|-id=676 bgcolor=#E9E9E9
| 42676 ||  || — || April 23, 1998 || Socorro || LINEAR || GEF || align=right | 2.8 km || 
|-id=677 bgcolor=#fefefe
| 42677 ||  || — || April 19, 1998 || Socorro || LINEAR || MAS || align=right | 1.6 km || 
|-id=678 bgcolor=#fefefe
| 42678 ||  || — || April 19, 1998 || Socorro || LINEAR || MAS || align=right | 1.8 km || 
|-id=679 bgcolor=#fefefe
| 42679 ||  || — || April 21, 1998 || Socorro || LINEAR || — || align=right | 1.8 km || 
|-id=680 bgcolor=#fefefe
| 42680 ||  || — || April 21, 1998 || Socorro || LINEAR || — || align=right | 2.7 km || 
|-id=681 bgcolor=#fefefe
| 42681 ||  || — || April 21, 1998 || Socorro || LINEAR || V || align=right | 2.4 km || 
|-id=682 bgcolor=#fefefe
| 42682 ||  || — || April 21, 1998 || Socorro || LINEAR || V || align=right | 3.2 km || 
|-id=683 bgcolor=#E9E9E9
| 42683 ||  || — || April 25, 1998 || La Silla || E. W. Elst || — || align=right | 2.2 km || 
|-id=684 bgcolor=#fefefe
| 42684 ||  || — || April 20, 1998 || Kitt Peak || Spacewatch || NYS || align=right | 1.4 km || 
|-id=685 bgcolor=#fefefe
| 42685 || 1998 JY || — || May 1, 1998 || Haleakala || NEAT || PHO || align=right | 4.3 km || 
|-id=686 bgcolor=#fefefe
| 42686 ||  || — || May 1, 1998 || Haleakala || NEAT || — || align=right | 4.8 km || 
|-id=687 bgcolor=#fefefe
| 42687 ||  || — || May 1, 1998 || Haleakala || NEAT || V || align=right | 2.2 km || 
|-id=688 bgcolor=#fefefe
| 42688 ||  || — || May 1, 1998 || Socorro || LINEAR || — || align=right | 2.8 km || 
|-id=689 bgcolor=#E9E9E9
| 42689 || 1998 KX || — || May 23, 1998 || Prescott || P. G. Comba || — || align=right | 2.5 km || 
|-id=690 bgcolor=#fefefe
| 42690 ||  || — || May 24, 1998 || Kitt Peak || Spacewatch || — || align=right | 2.7 km || 
|-id=691 bgcolor=#E9E9E9
| 42691 ||  || — || May 23, 1998 || Kitt Peak || Spacewatch || — || align=right | 2.1 km || 
|-id=692 bgcolor=#E9E9E9
| 42692 ||  || — || May 22, 1998 || Socorro || LINEAR || — || align=right | 2.9 km || 
|-id=693 bgcolor=#fefefe
| 42693 ||  || — || May 22, 1998 || Socorro || LINEAR || NYS || align=right | 2.9 km || 
|-id=694 bgcolor=#fefefe
| 42694 ||  || — || May 22, 1998 || Socorro || LINEAR || — || align=right | 2.8 km || 
|-id=695 bgcolor=#E9E9E9
| 42695 ||  || — || May 23, 1998 || Socorro || LINEAR || — || align=right | 2.6 km || 
|-id=696 bgcolor=#fefefe
| 42696 ||  || — || May 22, 1998 || Socorro || LINEAR || FLO || align=right | 2.1 km || 
|-id=697 bgcolor=#E9E9E9
| 42697 Lucapaolini ||  ||  || June 1, 1998 || La Silla || E. W. Elst || — || align=right | 3.1 km || 
|-id=698 bgcolor=#fefefe
| 42698 ||  || — || June 19, 1998 || Kitt Peak || Spacewatch || — || align=right | 3.1 km || 
|-id=699 bgcolor=#E9E9E9
| 42699 ||  || — || June 19, 1998 || Socorro || LINEAR || — || align=right | 2.9 km || 
|-id=700 bgcolor=#d6d6d6
| 42700 ||  || — || June 19, 1998 || Socorro || LINEAR || — || align=right | 11 km || 
|}

42701–42800 

|-bgcolor=#E9E9E9
| 42701 ||  || — || June 19, 1998 || Socorro || LINEAR || — || align=right | 5.9 km || 
|-id=702 bgcolor=#E9E9E9
| 42702 ||  || — || June 19, 1998 || Socorro || LINEAR || — || align=right | 3.5 km || 
|-id=703 bgcolor=#E9E9E9
| 42703 ||  || — || June 24, 1998 || Socorro || LINEAR || EUN || align=right | 3.9 km || 
|-id=704 bgcolor=#E9E9E9
| 42704 ||  || — || June 24, 1998 || Socorro || LINEAR || MAR || align=right | 5.3 km || 
|-id=705 bgcolor=#E9E9E9
| 42705 ||  || — || July 26, 1998 || La Silla || E. W. Elst || — || align=right | 4.7 km || 
|-id=706 bgcolor=#E9E9E9
| 42706 || 1998 QY || — || August 19, 1998 || Prescott || P. G. Comba || EUN || align=right | 3.8 km || 
|-id=707 bgcolor=#fefefe
| 42707 ||  || — || August 17, 1998 || Višnjan Observatory || Višnjan Obs. || — || align=right | 3.3 km || 
|-id=708 bgcolor=#E9E9E9
| 42708 ||  || — || August 17, 1998 || Socorro || LINEAR || — || align=right | 12 km || 
|-id=709 bgcolor=#E9E9E9
| 42709 ||  || — || August 17, 1998 || Socorro || LINEAR || — || align=right | 3.3 km || 
|-id=710 bgcolor=#d6d6d6
| 42710 ||  || — || August 17, 1998 || Socorro || LINEAR || TRE || align=right | 7.5 km || 
|-id=711 bgcolor=#d6d6d6
| 42711 ||  || — || August 25, 1998 || Višnjan Observatory || Višnjan Obs. || — || align=right | 7.9 km || 
|-id=712 bgcolor=#d6d6d6
| 42712 ||  || — || August 23, 1998 || Xinglong || SCAP || TIR || align=right | 6.3 km || 
|-id=713 bgcolor=#d6d6d6
| 42713 ||  || — || August 17, 1998 || Socorro || LINEAR || — || align=right | 8.5 km || 
|-id=714 bgcolor=#E9E9E9
| 42714 ||  || — || August 17, 1998 || Socorro || LINEAR || RAF || align=right | 3.2 km || 
|-id=715 bgcolor=#fefefe
| 42715 ||  || — || August 17, 1998 || Socorro || LINEAR || — || align=right | 1.7 km || 
|-id=716 bgcolor=#d6d6d6
| 42716 ||  || — || August 17, 1998 || Socorro || LINEAR || — || align=right | 7.1 km || 
|-id=717 bgcolor=#d6d6d6
| 42717 ||  || — || August 19, 1998 || Socorro || LINEAR || — || align=right | 5.2 km || 
|-id=718 bgcolor=#d6d6d6
| 42718 ||  || — || August 20, 1998 || Anderson Mesa || LONEOS || — || align=right | 5.7 km || 
|-id=719 bgcolor=#E9E9E9
| 42719 ||  || — || August 24, 1998 || Socorro || LINEAR || EUN || align=right | 4.1 km || 
|-id=720 bgcolor=#E9E9E9
| 42720 ||  || — || August 24, 1998 || Socorro || LINEAR || MIT || align=right | 6.6 km || 
|-id=721 bgcolor=#E9E9E9
| 42721 ||  || — || August 24, 1998 || Socorro || LINEAR || EUN || align=right | 3.1 km || 
|-id=722 bgcolor=#d6d6d6
| 42722 ||  || — || August 24, 1998 || Socorro || LINEAR || EOS || align=right | 5.5 km || 
|-id=723 bgcolor=#d6d6d6
| 42723 ||  || — || August 24, 1998 || Socorro || LINEAR || — || align=right | 10 km || 
|-id=724 bgcolor=#E9E9E9
| 42724 ||  || — || August 24, 1998 || Socorro || LINEAR || EUN || align=right | 7.0 km || 
|-id=725 bgcolor=#E9E9E9
| 42725 ||  || — || August 24, 1998 || Socorro || LINEAR || MAR || align=right | 5.1 km || 
|-id=726 bgcolor=#E9E9E9
| 42726 ||  || — || August 24, 1998 || Socorro || LINEAR || AER || align=right | 3.8 km || 
|-id=727 bgcolor=#d6d6d6
| 42727 ||  || — || August 24, 1998 || Socorro || LINEAR || — || align=right | 10 km || 
|-id=728 bgcolor=#d6d6d6
| 42728 ||  || — || August 24, 1998 || Socorro || LINEAR || — || align=right | 11 km || 
|-id=729 bgcolor=#E9E9E9
| 42729 ||  || — || August 24, 1998 || Socorro || LINEAR || — || align=right | 3.5 km || 
|-id=730 bgcolor=#E9E9E9
| 42730 ||  || — || August 25, 1998 || La Silla || E. W. Elst || — || align=right | 4.5 km || 
|-id=731 bgcolor=#d6d6d6
| 42731 ||  || — || August 25, 1998 || La Silla || E. W. Elst || EOS || align=right | 5.1 km || 
|-id=732 bgcolor=#d6d6d6
| 42732 ||  || — || September 12, 1998 || Oizumi || T. Kobayashi || VER || align=right | 14 km || 
|-id=733 bgcolor=#E9E9E9
| 42733 ||  || — || September 15, 1998 || Caussols || ODAS || — || align=right | 2.6 km || 
|-id=734 bgcolor=#d6d6d6
| 42734 ||  || — || September 14, 1998 || Socorro || LINEAR || — || align=right | 5.1 km || 
|-id=735 bgcolor=#d6d6d6
| 42735 ||  || — || September 14, 1998 || Socorro || LINEAR || BRA || align=right | 4.8 km || 
|-id=736 bgcolor=#d6d6d6
| 42736 ||  || — || September 14, 1998 || Socorro || LINEAR || — || align=right | 6.2 km || 
|-id=737 bgcolor=#d6d6d6
| 42737 ||  || — || September 14, 1998 || Socorro || LINEAR || — || align=right | 8.3 km || 
|-id=738 bgcolor=#d6d6d6
| 42738 ||  || — || September 14, 1998 || Socorro || LINEAR || HYG || align=right | 7.3 km || 
|-id=739 bgcolor=#d6d6d6
| 42739 ||  || — || September 14, 1998 || Socorro || LINEAR || — || align=right | 6.9 km || 
|-id=740 bgcolor=#d6d6d6
| 42740 ||  || — || September 14, 1998 || Socorro || LINEAR || VER || align=right | 7.4 km || 
|-id=741 bgcolor=#d6d6d6
| 42741 ||  || — || September 14, 1998 || Socorro || LINEAR || KOR || align=right | 3.9 km || 
|-id=742 bgcolor=#d6d6d6
| 42742 ||  || — || September 14, 1998 || Socorro || LINEAR || — || align=right | 6.6 km || 
|-id=743 bgcolor=#E9E9E9
| 42743 ||  || — || September 14, 1998 || Socorro || LINEAR || — || align=right | 5.1 km || 
|-id=744 bgcolor=#d6d6d6
| 42744 ||  || — || September 14, 1998 || Socorro || LINEAR || — || align=right | 8.6 km || 
|-id=745 bgcolor=#E9E9E9
| 42745 ||  || — || September 14, 1998 || Socorro || LINEAR || — || align=right | 6.9 km || 
|-id=746 bgcolor=#d6d6d6
| 42746 ||  || — || September 20, 1998 || Kitt Peak || Spacewatch || THM || align=right | 5.3 km || 
|-id=747 bgcolor=#d6d6d6
| 42747 Fuser ||  ||  || September 21, 1998 || Pianoro || V. Goretti || THM || align=right | 9.9 km || 
|-id=748 bgcolor=#d6d6d6
| 42748 Andrisani ||  ||  || September 21, 1998 || Pianoro || V. Goretti || — || align=right | 5.9 km || 
|-id=749 bgcolor=#d6d6d6
| 42749 ||  || — || September 22, 1998 || Anderson Mesa || LONEOS || — || align=right | 7.2 km || 
|-id=750 bgcolor=#d6d6d6
| 42750 ||  || — || September 16, 1998 || Anderson Mesa || LONEOS || EOS || align=right | 4.6 km || 
|-id=751 bgcolor=#d6d6d6
| 42751 ||  || — || September 16, 1998 || Anderson Mesa || LONEOS || — || align=right | 5.7 km || 
|-id=752 bgcolor=#d6d6d6
| 42752 ||  || — || September 16, 1998 || Anderson Mesa || LONEOS || — || align=right | 9.2 km || 
|-id=753 bgcolor=#d6d6d6
| 42753 ||  || — || September 17, 1998 || Anderson Mesa || LONEOS || — || align=right | 10 km || 
|-id=754 bgcolor=#d6d6d6
| 42754 ||  || — || September 17, 1998 || Anderson Mesa || LONEOS || — || align=right | 4.2 km || 
|-id=755 bgcolor=#d6d6d6
| 42755 ||  || — || September 17, 1998 || Anderson Mesa || LONEOS || — || align=right | 8.0 km || 
|-id=756 bgcolor=#d6d6d6
| 42756 ||  || — || September 25, 1998 || Xinglong || SCAP || — || align=right | 7.6 km || 
|-id=757 bgcolor=#d6d6d6
| 42757 ||  || — || September 19, 1998 || Socorro || LINEAR || — || align=right | 7.5 km || 
|-id=758 bgcolor=#d6d6d6
| 42758 ||  || — || September 21, 1998 || La Silla || E. W. Elst || — || align=right | 6.2 km || 
|-id=759 bgcolor=#d6d6d6
| 42759 ||  || — || September 21, 1998 || La Silla || E. W. Elst || — || align=right | 8.9 km || 
|-id=760 bgcolor=#d6d6d6
| 42760 ||  || — || September 26, 1998 || Socorro || LINEAR || — || align=right | 5.7 km || 
|-id=761 bgcolor=#E9E9E9
| 42761 ||  || — || September 26, 1998 || Socorro || LINEAR || — || align=right | 3.8 km || 
|-id=762 bgcolor=#d6d6d6
| 42762 ||  || — || September 26, 1998 || Socorro || LINEAR || — || align=right | 7.0 km || 
|-id=763 bgcolor=#fefefe
| 42763 ||  || — || September 26, 1998 || Socorro || LINEAR || — || align=right | 1.5 km || 
|-id=764 bgcolor=#d6d6d6
| 42764 ||  || — || September 26, 1998 || Socorro || LINEAR || HYG || align=right | 9.5 km || 
|-id=765 bgcolor=#d6d6d6
| 42765 ||  || — || September 26, 1998 || Socorro || LINEAR || — || align=right | 9.8 km || 
|-id=766 bgcolor=#d6d6d6
| 42766 ||  || — || September 18, 1998 || La Silla || E. W. Elst || EOS || align=right | 5.7 km || 
|-id=767 bgcolor=#d6d6d6
| 42767 ||  || — || September 26, 1998 || Socorro || LINEAR || 7:4 || align=right | 12 km || 
|-id=768 bgcolor=#E9E9E9
| 42768 ||  || — || September 19, 1998 || Anderson Mesa || LONEOS || CLO || align=right | 7.2 km || 
|-id=769 bgcolor=#d6d6d6
| 42769 ||  || — || October 12, 1998 || Kitt Peak || Spacewatch || — || align=right | 7.4 km || 
|-id=770 bgcolor=#d6d6d6
| 42770 ||  || — || October 13, 1998 || Višnjan Observatory || K. Korlević || THM || align=right | 9.8 km || 
|-id=771 bgcolor=#d6d6d6
| 42771 ||  || — || October 11, 1998 || Anderson Mesa || LONEOS || — || align=right | 4.0 km || 
|-id=772 bgcolor=#d6d6d6
| 42772 Kokotanekova ||  ||  || October 14, 1998 || Anderson Mesa || LONEOS || HYG || align=right | 6.6 km || 
|-id=773 bgcolor=#d6d6d6
| 42773 ||  || — || October 23, 1998 || Višnjan Observatory || K. Korlević || — || align=right | 8.2 km || 
|-id=774 bgcolor=#fefefe
| 42774 ||  || — || October 29, 1998 || Višnjan Observatory || K. Korlević || — || align=right | 2.2 km || 
|-id=775 bgcolor=#d6d6d6
| 42775 Bianchini ||  ||  || October 26, 1998 || Cima Ekar || U. Munari, F. Castellani || — || align=right | 12 km || 
|-id=776 bgcolor=#d6d6d6
| 42776 Casablanca ||  ||  || October 18, 1998 || La Silla || E. W. Elst || VER || align=right | 10 km || 
|-id=777 bgcolor=#d6d6d6
| 42777 ||  || — || October 18, 1998 || La Silla || E. W. Elst || — || align=right | 8.7 km || 
|-id=778 bgcolor=#E9E9E9
| 42778 ||  || — || October 28, 1998 || Socorro || LINEAR || GEF || align=right | 3.4 km || 
|-id=779 bgcolor=#d6d6d6
| 42779 ||  || — || November 10, 1998 || Socorro || LINEAR || — || align=right | 5.0 km || 
|-id=780 bgcolor=#d6d6d6
| 42780 ||  || — || November 10, 1998 || Socorro || LINEAR || URS || align=right | 11 km || 
|-id=781 bgcolor=#fefefe
| 42781 ||  || — || November 10, 1998 || Socorro || LINEAR || KLI || align=right | 6.5 km || 
|-id=782 bgcolor=#d6d6d6
| 42782 ||  || — || November 15, 1998 || Kitt Peak || Spacewatch || — || align=right | 10 km || 
|-id=783 bgcolor=#d6d6d6
| 42783 ||  || — || November 14, 1998 || Socorro || LINEAR || ALA || align=right | 15 km || 
|-id=784 bgcolor=#d6d6d6
| 42784 ||  || — || November 16, 1998 || Catalina || CSS || — || align=right | 13 km || 
|-id=785 bgcolor=#fefefe
| 42785 ||  || — || November 18, 1998 || Catalina || CSS || PHO || align=right | 3.3 km || 
|-id=786 bgcolor=#fefefe
| 42786 ||  || — || November 18, 1998 || Catalina || CSS || — || align=right | 4.8 km || 
|-id=787 bgcolor=#d6d6d6
| 42787 ||  || — || November 21, 1998 || Socorro || LINEAR || EOS || align=right | 7.9 km || 
|-id=788 bgcolor=#d6d6d6
| 42788 ||  || — || December 15, 1998 || Caussols || ODAS || — || align=right | 4.1 km || 
|-id=789 bgcolor=#fefefe
| 42789 ||  || — || December 14, 1998 || Socorro || LINEAR || V || align=right | 2.5 km || 
|-id=790 bgcolor=#E9E9E9
| 42790 ||  || — || December 15, 1998 || Socorro || LINEAR || MAR || align=right | 5.9 km || 
|-id=791 bgcolor=#E9E9E9
| 42791 ||  || — || January 15, 1999 || Kitt Peak || Spacewatch || — || align=right | 3.2 km || 
|-id=792 bgcolor=#fefefe
| 42792 ||  || — || January 7, 1999 || Kitt Peak || Spacewatch || V || align=right | 1.3 km || 
|-id=793 bgcolor=#E9E9E9
| 42793 ||  || — || January 19, 1999 || Grasslands || J. McGaha || — || align=right | 5.2 km || 
|-id=794 bgcolor=#fefefe
| 42794 ||  || — || January 16, 1999 || Socorro || LINEAR || — || align=right | 4.5 km || 
|-id=795 bgcolor=#fefefe
| 42795 Derekmuller ||  ||  || February 14, 1999 || Caussols || ODAS || — || align=right | 3.2 km || 
|-id=796 bgcolor=#fefefe
| 42796 ||  || — || February 10, 1999 || Socorro || LINEAR || — || align=right | 2.4 km || 
|-id=797 bgcolor=#E9E9E9
| 42797 ||  || — || February 12, 1999 || Socorro || LINEAR || MAR || align=right | 8.6 km || 
|-id=798 bgcolor=#fefefe
| 42798 ||  || — || February 19, 1999 || Oizumi || T. Kobayashi || FLO || align=right | 3.7 km || 
|-id=799 bgcolor=#E9E9E9
| 42799 ||  || — || February 17, 1999 || Socorro || LINEAR || — || align=right | 10 km || 
|-id=800 bgcolor=#E9E9E9
| 42800 ||  || — || March 19, 1999 || Socorro || LINEAR || HNS || align=right | 5.5 km || 
|}

42801–42900 

|-bgcolor=#E9E9E9
| 42801 ||  || — || March 20, 1999 || Socorro || LINEAR || — || align=right | 6.8 km || 
|-id=802 bgcolor=#fefefe
| 42802 ||  || — || April 15, 1999 || Socorro || LINEAR || KLI || align=right | 5.4 km || 
|-id=803 bgcolor=#E9E9E9
| 42803 ||  || — || April 15, 1999 || Socorro || LINEAR || GEF || align=right | 6.5 km || 
|-id=804 bgcolor=#fefefe
| 42804 ||  || — || April 12, 1999 || Socorro || LINEAR || — || align=right | 2.9 km || 
|-id=805 bgcolor=#FA8072
| 42805 ||  || — || May 8, 1999 || Catalina || CSS || — || align=right | 2.5 km || 
|-id=806 bgcolor=#fefefe
| 42806 ||  || — || May 10, 1999 || Socorro || LINEAR || H || align=right | 3.2 km || 
|-id=807 bgcolor=#fefefe
| 42807 ||  || — || May 8, 1999 || Catalina || CSS || — || align=right | 3.3 km || 
|-id=808 bgcolor=#fefefe
| 42808 ||  || — || May 12, 1999 || Socorro || LINEAR || PHO || align=right | 3.1 km || 
|-id=809 bgcolor=#d6d6d6
| 42809 ||  || — || May 10, 1999 || Socorro || LINEAR || 7:4 || align=right | 14 km || 
|-id=810 bgcolor=#fefefe
| 42810 ||  || — || May 12, 1999 || Socorro || LINEAR || — || align=right | 2.9 km || 
|-id=811 bgcolor=#FA8072
| 42811 ||  || — || May 7, 1999 || Socorro || LINEAR || H || align=right | 2.8 km || 
|-id=812 bgcolor=#E9E9E9
| 42812 ||  || — || May 12, 1999 || Socorro || LINEAR || DOR || align=right | 9.8 km || 
|-id=813 bgcolor=#fefefe
| 42813 ||  || — || May 13, 1999 || Socorro || LINEAR || — || align=right | 3.1 km || 
|-id=814 bgcolor=#fefefe
| 42814 ||  || — || June 9, 1999 || Socorro || LINEAR || — || align=right | 1.9 km || 
|-id=815 bgcolor=#fefefe
| 42815 ||  || — || June 15, 1999 || Kitt Peak || Spacewatch || NYS || align=right | 2.0 km || 
|-id=816 bgcolor=#E9E9E9
| 42816 ||  || — || July 12, 1999 || Socorro || LINEAR || — || align=right | 4.7 km || 
|-id=817 bgcolor=#fefefe
| 42817 ||  || — || July 13, 1999 || Socorro || LINEAR || FLO || align=right | 1.9 km || 
|-id=818 bgcolor=#fefefe
| 42818 ||  || — || July 12, 1999 || Višnjan Observatory || K. Korlević || NYS || align=right | 2.0 km || 
|-id=819 bgcolor=#fefefe
| 42819 ||  || — || July 15, 1999 || Višnjan Observatory || K. Korlević || NYS || align=right | 3.6 km || 
|-id=820 bgcolor=#fefefe
| 42820 ||  || — || July 13, 1999 || Socorro || LINEAR || — || align=right | 3.8 km || 
|-id=821 bgcolor=#fefefe
| 42821 ||  || — || July 13, 1999 || Socorro || LINEAR || — || align=right | 2.3 km || 
|-id=822 bgcolor=#fefefe
| 42822 ||  || — || July 14, 1999 || Socorro || LINEAR || FLO || align=right | 1.5 km || 
|-id=823 bgcolor=#fefefe
| 42823 ||  || — || July 14, 1999 || Socorro || LINEAR || — || align=right | 1.7 km || 
|-id=824 bgcolor=#fefefe
| 42824 ||  || — || July 14, 1999 || Socorro || LINEAR || V || align=right | 2.8 km || 
|-id=825 bgcolor=#fefefe
| 42825 ||  || — || July 14, 1999 || Socorro || LINEAR || — || align=right | 2.2 km || 
|-id=826 bgcolor=#fefefe
| 42826 ||  || — || July 14, 1999 || Socorro || LINEAR || — || align=right | 2.1 km || 
|-id=827 bgcolor=#fefefe
| 42827 ||  || — || July 14, 1999 || Socorro || LINEAR || — || align=right | 2.3 km || 
|-id=828 bgcolor=#fefefe
| 42828 ||  || — || July 14, 1999 || Socorro || LINEAR || — || align=right | 2.2 km || 
|-id=829 bgcolor=#fefefe
| 42829 ||  || — || July 14, 1999 || Socorro || LINEAR || — || align=right | 3.2 km || 
|-id=830 bgcolor=#fefefe
| 42830 ||  || — || July 14, 1999 || Socorro || LINEAR || FLO || align=right | 1.8 km || 
|-id=831 bgcolor=#fefefe
| 42831 ||  || — || July 13, 1999 || Socorro || LINEAR || — || align=right | 3.5 km || 
|-id=832 bgcolor=#fefefe
| 42832 ||  || — || July 13, 1999 || Socorro || LINEAR || — || align=right | 3.1 km || 
|-id=833 bgcolor=#E9E9E9
| 42833 ||  || — || July 13, 1999 || Socorro || LINEAR || ADE || align=right | 8.1 km || 
|-id=834 bgcolor=#fefefe
| 42834 ||  || — || July 13, 1999 || Socorro || LINEAR || FLO || align=right | 2.5 km || 
|-id=835 bgcolor=#E9E9E9
| 42835 ||  || — || July 12, 1999 || Socorro || LINEAR || MAR || align=right | 5.4 km || 
|-id=836 bgcolor=#E9E9E9
| 42836 ||  || — || July 22, 1999 || Socorro || LINEAR || — || align=right | 3.0 km || 
|-id=837 bgcolor=#fefefe
| 42837 ||  || — || August 9, 1999 || Reedy Creek || J. Broughton || — || align=right | 7.5 km || 
|-id=838 bgcolor=#E9E9E9
| 42838 ||  || — || August 13, 1999 || Ondřejov || P. Pravec, P. Kušnirák || — || align=right | 3.5 km || 
|-id=839 bgcolor=#fefefe
| 42839 ||  || — || August 7, 1999 || Anderson Mesa || LONEOS || — || align=right | 1.6 km || 
|-id=840 bgcolor=#fefefe
| 42840 || 1999 RU || — || September 4, 1999 || Reedy Creek || J. Broughton || — || align=right | 2.1 km || 
|-id=841 bgcolor=#fefefe
| 42841 ||  || — || September 4, 1999 || Catalina || CSS || FLO || align=right | 1.8 km || 
|-id=842 bgcolor=#fefefe
| 42842 ||  || — || September 4, 1999 || Kitt Peak || Spacewatch || — || align=right | 1.8 km || 
|-id=843 bgcolor=#fefefe
| 42843 ||  || — || September 7, 1999 || Socorro || LINEAR || PHOslow || align=right | 2.5 km || 
|-id=844 bgcolor=#fefefe
| 42844 ||  || — || September 7, 1999 || Socorro || LINEAR || — || align=right | 2.2 km || 
|-id=845 bgcolor=#fefefe
| 42845 ||  || — || September 7, 1999 || Socorro || LINEAR || NYS || align=right | 4.9 km || 
|-id=846 bgcolor=#fefefe
| 42846 ||  || — || September 7, 1999 || Socorro || LINEAR || FLO || align=right | 1.9 km || 
|-id=847 bgcolor=#fefefe
| 42847 ||  || — || September 11, 1999 || Siding Spring || R. H. McNaught || PHO || align=right | 3.5 km || 
|-id=848 bgcolor=#d6d6d6
| 42848 ||  || — || September 13, 1999 || Višnjan Observatory || K. Korlević || THM || align=right | 6.4 km || 
|-id=849 bgcolor=#E9E9E9
| 42849 Podjavorinská ||  ||  || September 15, 1999 || Modra || A. Galád, P. Kolény || — || align=right | 5.0 km || 
|-id=850 bgcolor=#fefefe
| 42850 ||  || — || September 7, 1999 || Socorro || LINEAR || NYS || align=right | 2.1 km || 
|-id=851 bgcolor=#fefefe
| 42851 ||  || — || September 7, 1999 || Socorro || LINEAR || V || align=right | 3.0 km || 
|-id=852 bgcolor=#E9E9E9
| 42852 ||  || — || September 7, 1999 || Socorro || LINEAR || — || align=right | 5.6 km || 
|-id=853 bgcolor=#fefefe
| 42853 ||  || — || September 7, 1999 || Socorro || LINEAR || NYS || align=right | 4.4 km || 
|-id=854 bgcolor=#d6d6d6
| 42854 ||  || — || September 7, 1999 || Socorro || LINEAR || — || align=right | 5.1 km || 
|-id=855 bgcolor=#fefefe
| 42855 ||  || — || September 7, 1999 || Socorro || LINEAR || — || align=right | 2.3 km || 
|-id=856 bgcolor=#E9E9E9
| 42856 ||  || — || September 7, 1999 || Socorro || LINEAR || — || align=right | 3.4 km || 
|-id=857 bgcolor=#fefefe
| 42857 ||  || — || September 7, 1999 || Socorro || LINEAR || FLO || align=right | 1.7 km || 
|-id=858 bgcolor=#fefefe
| 42858 ||  || — || September 7, 1999 || Socorro || LINEAR || V || align=right | 1.3 km || 
|-id=859 bgcolor=#d6d6d6
| 42859 ||  || — || September 7, 1999 || Socorro || LINEAR || — || align=right | 7.6 km || 
|-id=860 bgcolor=#E9E9E9
| 42860 ||  || — || September 7, 1999 || Socorro || LINEAR || MIS || align=right | 7.3 km || 
|-id=861 bgcolor=#fefefe
| 42861 ||  || — || September 7, 1999 || Socorro || LINEAR || FLO || align=right | 2.4 km || 
|-id=862 bgcolor=#E9E9E9
| 42862 ||  || — || September 7, 1999 || Socorro || LINEAR || — || align=right | 3.1 km || 
|-id=863 bgcolor=#E9E9E9
| 42863 ||  || — || September 7, 1999 || Socorro || LINEAR || — || align=right | 2.7 km || 
|-id=864 bgcolor=#fefefe
| 42864 ||  || — || September 8, 1999 || Socorro || LINEAR || — || align=right | 1.8 km || 
|-id=865 bgcolor=#fefefe
| 42865 ||  || — || September 8, 1999 || Socorro || LINEAR || V || align=right | 1.8 km || 
|-id=866 bgcolor=#fefefe
| 42866 ||  || — || September 8, 1999 || Socorro || LINEAR || V || align=right | 2.7 km || 
|-id=867 bgcolor=#E9E9E9
| 42867 ||  || — || September 9, 1999 || Socorro || LINEAR || — || align=right | 4.8 km || 
|-id=868 bgcolor=#fefefe
| 42868 ||  || — || September 9, 1999 || Socorro || LINEAR || — || align=right | 4.5 km || 
|-id=869 bgcolor=#fefefe
| 42869 ||  || — || September 9, 1999 || Socorro || LINEAR || — || align=right | 3.3 km || 
|-id=870 bgcolor=#E9E9E9
| 42870 ||  || — || September 9, 1999 || Socorro || LINEAR || PAD || align=right | 6.6 km || 
|-id=871 bgcolor=#fefefe
| 42871 ||  || — || September 9, 1999 || Socorro || LINEAR || — || align=right | 1.9 km || 
|-id=872 bgcolor=#fefefe
| 42872 ||  || — || September 9, 1999 || Socorro || LINEAR || — || align=right | 3.1 km || 
|-id=873 bgcolor=#fefefe
| 42873 ||  || — || September 9, 1999 || Socorro || LINEAR || V || align=right | 1.7 km || 
|-id=874 bgcolor=#fefefe
| 42874 ||  || — || September 9, 1999 || Socorro || LINEAR || V || align=right | 2.8 km || 
|-id=875 bgcolor=#fefefe
| 42875 ||  || — || September 9, 1999 || Socorro || LINEAR || — || align=right | 3.1 km || 
|-id=876 bgcolor=#fefefe
| 42876 ||  || — || September 9, 1999 || Socorro || LINEAR || V || align=right | 1.8 km || 
|-id=877 bgcolor=#fefefe
| 42877 ||  || — || September 9, 1999 || Socorro || LINEAR || V || align=right | 1.9 km || 
|-id=878 bgcolor=#fefefe
| 42878 ||  || — || September 9, 1999 || Socorro || LINEAR || — || align=right | 2.5 km || 
|-id=879 bgcolor=#fefefe
| 42879 ||  || — || September 9, 1999 || Socorro || LINEAR || — || align=right | 1.4 km || 
|-id=880 bgcolor=#fefefe
| 42880 ||  || — || September 9, 1999 || Socorro || LINEAR || FLO || align=right | 1.9 km || 
|-id=881 bgcolor=#fefefe
| 42881 ||  || — || September 9, 1999 || Socorro || LINEAR || — || align=right | 2.4 km || 
|-id=882 bgcolor=#fefefe
| 42882 ||  || — || September 9, 1999 || Socorro || LINEAR || — || align=right | 2.2 km || 
|-id=883 bgcolor=#fefefe
| 42883 ||  || — || September 9, 1999 || Socorro || LINEAR || — || align=right | 2.4 km || 
|-id=884 bgcolor=#fefefe
| 42884 ||  || — || September 9, 1999 || Socorro || LINEAR || — || align=right | 2.1 km || 
|-id=885 bgcolor=#fefefe
| 42885 ||  || — || September 9, 1999 || Socorro || LINEAR || V || align=right | 2.0 km || 
|-id=886 bgcolor=#fefefe
| 42886 ||  || — || September 9, 1999 || Socorro || LINEAR || FLO || align=right | 1.8 km || 
|-id=887 bgcolor=#FA8072
| 42887 ||  || — || September 9, 1999 || Socorro || LINEAR || — || align=right | 2.4 km || 
|-id=888 bgcolor=#E9E9E9
| 42888 ||  || — || September 9, 1999 || Socorro || LINEAR || — || align=right | 5.4 km || 
|-id=889 bgcolor=#fefefe
| 42889 ||  || — || September 9, 1999 || Socorro || LINEAR || V || align=right | 2.2 km || 
|-id=890 bgcolor=#E9E9E9
| 42890 ||  || — || September 9, 1999 || Socorro || LINEAR || — || align=right | 3.8 km || 
|-id=891 bgcolor=#fefefe
| 42891 ||  || — || September 9, 1999 || Socorro || LINEAR || — || align=right | 2.4 km || 
|-id=892 bgcolor=#E9E9E9
| 42892 ||  || — || September 9, 1999 || Socorro || LINEAR || EUN || align=right | 7.8 km || 
|-id=893 bgcolor=#fefefe
| 42893 ||  || — || September 9, 1999 || Socorro || LINEAR || — || align=right | 2.3 km || 
|-id=894 bgcolor=#fefefe
| 42894 ||  || — || September 9, 1999 || Socorro || LINEAR || — || align=right | 2.3 km || 
|-id=895 bgcolor=#fefefe
| 42895 ||  || — || September 9, 1999 || Socorro || LINEAR || FLO || align=right | 1.9 km || 
|-id=896 bgcolor=#E9E9E9
| 42896 ||  || — || September 9, 1999 || Socorro || LINEAR || — || align=right | 3.0 km || 
|-id=897 bgcolor=#fefefe
| 42897 ||  || — || September 9, 1999 || Socorro || LINEAR || — || align=right | 1.9 km || 
|-id=898 bgcolor=#fefefe
| 42898 ||  || — || September 9, 1999 || Socorro || LINEAR || NYS || align=right | 1.8 km || 
|-id=899 bgcolor=#E9E9E9
| 42899 ||  || — || September 7, 1999 || Socorro || LINEAR || — || align=right | 7.5 km || 
|-id=900 bgcolor=#fefefe
| 42900 ||  || — || September 8, 1999 || Socorro || LINEAR || — || align=right | 2.3 km || 
|}

42901–43000 

|-bgcolor=#fefefe
| 42901 ||  || — || September 8, 1999 || Socorro || LINEAR || — || align=right | 2.4 km || 
|-id=902 bgcolor=#d6d6d6
| 42902 ||  || — || September 8, 1999 || Socorro || LINEAR || 7:4 || align=right | 8.4 km || 
|-id=903 bgcolor=#E9E9E9
| 42903 ||  || — || September 8, 1999 || Socorro || LINEAR || — || align=right | 6.3 km || 
|-id=904 bgcolor=#E9E9E9
| 42904 ||  || — || September 8, 1999 || Socorro || LINEAR || — || align=right | 4.5 km || 
|-id=905 bgcolor=#E9E9E9
| 42905 ||  || — || September 8, 1999 || Socorro || LINEAR || — || align=right | 8.6 km || 
|-id=906 bgcolor=#E9E9E9
| 42906 ||  || — || September 8, 1999 || Socorro || LINEAR || MAR || align=right | 3.0 km || 
|-id=907 bgcolor=#E9E9E9
| 42907 ||  || — || September 8, 1999 || Socorro || LINEAR || — || align=right | 4.5 km || 
|-id=908 bgcolor=#fefefe
| 42908 ||  || — || September 5, 1999 || Anderson Mesa || LONEOS || — || align=right | 2.1 km || 
|-id=909 bgcolor=#fefefe
| 42909 ||  || — || September 4, 1999 || Anderson Mesa || LONEOS || — || align=right | 2.0 km || 
|-id=910 bgcolor=#fefefe
| 42910 Samanthalawler ||  ||  || September 5, 1999 || Anderson Mesa || LONEOS || KLI || align=right | 4.8 km || 
|-id=911 bgcolor=#fefefe
| 42911 ||  || — || September 5, 1999 || Anderson Mesa || LONEOS || — || align=right | 2.2 km || 
|-id=912 bgcolor=#fefefe
| 42912 ||  || — || September 5, 1999 || Catalina || CSS || — || align=right | 2.3 km || 
|-id=913 bgcolor=#E9E9E9
| 42913 ||  || — || September 7, 1999 || Catalina || CSS || — || align=right | 3.1 km || 
|-id=914 bgcolor=#fefefe
| 42914 ||  || — || September 9, 1999 || Anderson Mesa || LONEOS || — || align=right | 5.8 km || 
|-id=915 bgcolor=#fefefe
| 42915 ||  || — || September 9, 1999 || Anderson Mesa || LONEOS || V || align=right | 2.0 km || 
|-id=916 bgcolor=#fefefe
| 42916 ||  || — || September 8, 1999 || Catalina || CSS || V || align=right | 1.7 km || 
|-id=917 bgcolor=#E9E9E9
| 42917 ||  || — || September 21, 1999 || Calgary || G. W. Billings || — || align=right | 12 km || 
|-id=918 bgcolor=#fefefe
| 42918 ||  || — || September 29, 1999 || Višnjan Observatory || K. Korlević || — || align=right | 2.3 km || 
|-id=919 bgcolor=#fefefe
| 42919 ||  || — || September 29, 1999 || Višnjan Observatory || K. Korlević || EUT || align=right | 1.7 km || 
|-id=920 bgcolor=#fefefe
| 42920 ||  || — || September 29, 1999 || Socorro || LINEAR || — || align=right | 4.2 km || 
|-id=921 bgcolor=#fefefe
| 42921 ||  || — || September 29, 1999 || Socorro || LINEAR || — || align=right | 3.8 km || 
|-id=922 bgcolor=#E9E9E9
| 42922 ||  || — || September 29, 1999 || Socorro || LINEAR || GEF || align=right | 6.4 km || 
|-id=923 bgcolor=#fefefe
| 42923 ||  || — || September 30, 1999 || Socorro || LINEAR || FLO || align=right | 3.8 km || 
|-id=924 bgcolor=#fefefe
| 42924 Betlem ||  ||  || October 2, 1999 || Ondřejov || Ondřejov Obs. || — || align=right | 1.7 km || 
|-id=925 bgcolor=#fefefe
| 42925 ||  || — || October 6, 1999 || Farpoint || G. Bell, G. Hug || V || align=right | 1.7 km || 
|-id=926 bgcolor=#fefefe
| 42926 ||  || — || October 6, 1999 || Višnjan Observatory || K. Korlević, M. Jurić || — || align=right | 3.8 km || 
|-id=927 bgcolor=#fefefe
| 42927 ||  || — || October 7, 1999 || Powell || Powell Obs. || — || align=right | 2.8 km || 
|-id=928 bgcolor=#fefefe
| 42928 ||  || — || October 2, 1999 || Socorro || LINEAR || PHO || align=right | 2.2 km || 
|-id=929 bgcolor=#fefefe
| 42929 Francini ||  ||  || October 8, 1999 || San Marcello || L. Tesi, G. Forti || NYS || align=right | 1.8 km || 
|-id=930 bgcolor=#fefefe
| 42930 ||  || — || October 6, 1999 || Siding Spring || R. H. McNaught || PHO || align=right | 4.1 km || 
|-id=931 bgcolor=#E9E9E9
| 42931 ||  || — || October 15, 1999 || Višnjan Observatory || K. Korlević || — || align=right | 7.9 km || 
|-id=932 bgcolor=#E9E9E9
| 42932 ||  || — || October 12, 1999 || Uccle || T. Pauwels || — || align=right | 4.1 km || 
|-id=933 bgcolor=#E9E9E9
| 42933 ||  || — || October 15, 1999 || Siding Spring || R. H. McNaught || — || align=right | 6.5 km || 
|-id=934 bgcolor=#fefefe
| 42934 ||  || — || October 3, 1999 || Socorro || LINEAR || NYS || align=right | 1.4 km || 
|-id=935 bgcolor=#fefefe
| 42935 ||  || — || October 3, 1999 || Socorro || LINEAR || NYS || align=right | 1.6 km || 
|-id=936 bgcolor=#d6d6d6
| 42936 ||  || — || October 3, 1999 || Socorro || LINEAR || KOR || align=right | 3.8 km || 
|-id=937 bgcolor=#E9E9E9
| 42937 ||  || — || October 4, 1999 || Socorro || LINEAR || — || align=right | 5.1 km || 
|-id=938 bgcolor=#E9E9E9
| 42938 ||  || — || October 4, 1999 || Socorro || LINEAR || — || align=right | 5.4 km || 
|-id=939 bgcolor=#E9E9E9
| 42939 ||  || — || October 4, 1999 || Socorro || LINEAR || HEN || align=right | 3.1 km || 
|-id=940 bgcolor=#d6d6d6
| 42940 ||  || — || October 1, 1999 || Catalina || CSS || — || align=right | 6.5 km || 
|-id=941 bgcolor=#fefefe
| 42941 ||  || — || October 10, 1999 || Kitt Peak || Spacewatch || NYS || align=right | 2.9 km || 
|-id=942 bgcolor=#fefefe
| 42942 ||  || — || October 10, 1999 || Kitt Peak || Spacewatch || NYS || align=right | 1.8 km || 
|-id=943 bgcolor=#fefefe
| 42943 ||  || — || October 2, 1999 || Socorro || LINEAR || — || align=right | 1.7 km || 
|-id=944 bgcolor=#fefefe
| 42944 ||  || — || October 2, 1999 || Socorro || LINEAR || NYS || align=right | 2.1 km || 
|-id=945 bgcolor=#E9E9E9
| 42945 ||  || — || October 2, 1999 || Socorro || LINEAR || — || align=right | 3.1 km || 
|-id=946 bgcolor=#E9E9E9
| 42946 ||  || — || October 2, 1999 || Socorro || LINEAR || — || align=right | 4.7 km || 
|-id=947 bgcolor=#fefefe
| 42947 ||  || — || October 2, 1999 || Socorro || LINEAR || V || align=right | 2.0 km || 
|-id=948 bgcolor=#fefefe
| 42948 ||  || — || October 2, 1999 || Socorro || LINEAR || — || align=right | 2.9 km || 
|-id=949 bgcolor=#fefefe
| 42949 ||  || — || October 2, 1999 || Socorro || LINEAR || — || align=right | 2.2 km || 
|-id=950 bgcolor=#fefefe
| 42950 ||  || — || October 2, 1999 || Socorro || LINEAR || V || align=right | 2.5 km || 
|-id=951 bgcolor=#fefefe
| 42951 ||  || — || October 2, 1999 || Socorro || LINEAR || — || align=right | 2.4 km || 
|-id=952 bgcolor=#E9E9E9
| 42952 ||  || — || October 2, 1999 || Socorro || LINEAR || — || align=right | 4.7 km || 
|-id=953 bgcolor=#fefefe
| 42953 ||  || — || October 4, 1999 || Socorro || LINEAR || V || align=right | 2.4 km || 
|-id=954 bgcolor=#fefefe
| 42954 ||  || — || October 4, 1999 || Socorro || LINEAR || — || align=right | 1.9 km || 
|-id=955 bgcolor=#fefefe
| 42955 ||  || — || October 4, 1999 || Socorro || LINEAR || NYS || align=right | 1.5 km || 
|-id=956 bgcolor=#fefefe
| 42956 ||  || — || October 4, 1999 || Socorro || LINEAR || — || align=right | 1.8 km || 
|-id=957 bgcolor=#E9E9E9
| 42957 ||  || — || October 4, 1999 || Socorro || LINEAR || — || align=right | 5.1 km || 
|-id=958 bgcolor=#fefefe
| 42958 ||  || — || October 4, 1999 || Socorro || LINEAR || — || align=right | 1.3 km || 
|-id=959 bgcolor=#E9E9E9
| 42959 ||  || — || October 6, 1999 || Socorro || LINEAR || — || align=right | 3.0 km || 
|-id=960 bgcolor=#fefefe
| 42960 ||  || — || October 6, 1999 || Socorro || LINEAR || — || align=right | 1.6 km || 
|-id=961 bgcolor=#E9E9E9
| 42961 ||  || — || October 6, 1999 || Socorro || LINEAR || MAR || align=right | 2.2 km || 
|-id=962 bgcolor=#fefefe
| 42962 ||  || — || October 6, 1999 || Socorro || LINEAR || NYS || align=right | 1.4 km || 
|-id=963 bgcolor=#E9E9E9
| 42963 ||  || — || October 7, 1999 || Socorro || LINEAR || EUN || align=right | 4.7 km || 
|-id=964 bgcolor=#E9E9E9
| 42964 ||  || — || October 7, 1999 || Socorro || LINEAR || — || align=right | 2.2 km || 
|-id=965 bgcolor=#E9E9E9
| 42965 ||  || — || October 7, 1999 || Socorro || LINEAR || — || align=right | 4.7 km || 
|-id=966 bgcolor=#E9E9E9
| 42966 ||  || — || October 7, 1999 || Socorro || LINEAR || — || align=right | 2.8 km || 
|-id=967 bgcolor=#fefefe
| 42967 ||  || — || October 10, 1999 || Socorro || LINEAR || — || align=right | 2.6 km || 
|-id=968 bgcolor=#E9E9E9
| 42968 ||  || — || October 10, 1999 || Socorro || LINEAR || — || align=right | 3.3 km || 
|-id=969 bgcolor=#E9E9E9
| 42969 ||  || — || October 10, 1999 || Socorro || LINEAR || — || align=right | 2.8 km || 
|-id=970 bgcolor=#E9E9E9
| 42970 ||  || — || October 10, 1999 || Socorro || LINEAR || — || align=right | 2.8 km || 
|-id=971 bgcolor=#E9E9E9
| 42971 ||  || — || October 10, 1999 || Socorro || LINEAR || — || align=right | 2.7 km || 
|-id=972 bgcolor=#E9E9E9
| 42972 ||  || — || October 10, 1999 || Socorro || LINEAR || MAR || align=right | 3.0 km || 
|-id=973 bgcolor=#E9E9E9
| 42973 ||  || — || October 12, 1999 || Socorro || LINEAR || — || align=right | 6.3 km || 
|-id=974 bgcolor=#E9E9E9
| 42974 ||  || — || October 12, 1999 || Socorro || LINEAR || — || align=right | 3.9 km || 
|-id=975 bgcolor=#E9E9E9
| 42975 ||  || — || October 12, 1999 || Socorro || LINEAR || WIT || align=right | 3.9 km || 
|-id=976 bgcolor=#E9E9E9
| 42976 ||  || — || October 15, 1999 || Socorro || LINEAR || — || align=right | 2.6 km || 
|-id=977 bgcolor=#fefefe
| 42977 ||  || — || October 15, 1999 || Socorro || LINEAR || NYS || align=right | 1.8 km || 
|-id=978 bgcolor=#E9E9E9
| 42978 ||  || — || October 1, 1999 || Catalina || CSS || GEF || align=right | 3.1 km || 
|-id=979 bgcolor=#fefefe
| 42979 ||  || — || October 1, 1999 || Catalina || CSS || — || align=right | 2.0 km || 
|-id=980 bgcolor=#E9E9E9
| 42980 ||  || — || October 1, 1999 || Catalina || CSS || — || align=right | 3.5 km || 
|-id=981 bgcolor=#E9E9E9
| 42981 Jenniskens ||  ||  || October 2, 1999 || Ondřejov || Ondřejov Obs. || — || align=right | 2.6 km || 
|-id=982 bgcolor=#fefefe
| 42982 ||  || — || October 5, 1999 || Anderson Mesa || LONEOS || — || align=right | 2.2 km || 
|-id=983 bgcolor=#fefefe
| 42983 ||  || — || October 2, 1999 || Anderson Mesa || LONEOS || — || align=right | 3.5 km || 
|-id=984 bgcolor=#E9E9E9
| 42984 ||  || — || October 2, 1999 || Catalina || CSS || — || align=right | 2.5 km || 
|-id=985 bgcolor=#d6d6d6
| 42985 Marsset ||  ||  || October 4, 1999 || Anderson Mesa || LONEOS || LIX || align=right | 11 km || 
|-id=986 bgcolor=#E9E9E9
| 42986 ||  || — || October 5, 1999 || Catalina || CSS || — || align=right | 3.9 km || 
|-id=987 bgcolor=#E9E9E9
| 42987 ||  || — || October 4, 1999 || Catalina || CSS || EUN || align=right | 4.2 km || 
|-id=988 bgcolor=#E9E9E9
| 42988 ||  || — || October 4, 1999 || Catalina || CSS || — || align=right | 9.8 km || 
|-id=989 bgcolor=#E9E9E9
| 42989 ||  || — || October 7, 1999 || Catalina || CSS || — || align=right | 5.4 km || 
|-id=990 bgcolor=#E9E9E9
| 42990 ||  || — || October 9, 1999 || Socorro || LINEAR || — || align=right | 2.7 km || 
|-id=991 bgcolor=#fefefe
| 42991 ||  || — || October 8, 1999 || Socorro || LINEAR || V || align=right | 1.8 km || 
|-id=992 bgcolor=#E9E9E9
| 42992 ||  || — || October 10, 1999 || Socorro || LINEAR || — || align=right | 2.1 km || 
|-id=993 bgcolor=#E9E9E9
| 42993 ||  || — || October 3, 1999 || Socorro || LINEAR || PAE || align=right | 9.4 km || 
|-id=994 bgcolor=#E9E9E9
| 42994 ||  || — || October 5, 1999 || Socorro || LINEAR || — || align=right | 7.5 km || 
|-id=995 bgcolor=#E9E9E9
| 42995 ||  || — || October 9, 1999 || Socorro || LINEAR || — || align=right | 3.8 km || 
|-id=996 bgcolor=#E9E9E9
| 42996 ||  || — || October 10, 1999 || Socorro || LINEAR || EUN || align=right | 4.3 km || 
|-id=997 bgcolor=#fefefe
| 42997 ||  || — || October 18, 1999 || Kleť || Kleť Obs. || — || align=right | 2.8 km || 
|-id=998 bgcolor=#E9E9E9
| 42998 Malinafrank ||  ||  || October 17, 1999 || Ondřejov || P. Pravec, P. Kušnirák || RAF || align=right | 5.9 km || 
|-id=999 bgcolor=#d6d6d6
| 42999 ||  || — || October 18, 1999 || Ondřejov || P. Pravec || — || align=right | 6.2 km || 
|-id=000 bgcolor=#E9E9E9
| 43000 ||  || — || October 29, 1999 || Catalina || CSS || — || align=right | 3.6 km || 
|}

References

External links 
 Discovery Circumstances: Numbered Minor Planets (40001)–(45000) (IAU Minor Planet Center)

0042